Saint George is a civil parish of Antigua and Barbuda, located on the island of Antigua. It had a population of 7,976 in 2011.

History 
When North Sound was divided into New North Sound and Old North Sound, Saint George was initially a part of the Parish of Saint Peter as part of the Division of North Sound. New North Sound became the parish of Saint George, while Old North Sound remained a part of Saint Peter. The Division of New North Sound is the only division in Saint George as a result.

The Parish Boundaries Act stated that "the parish of Saint George shall continue to include all the homes, plantations, and lands in the division of New North Sound, extending from there westward and including all the homes, plantations, and lands in the division of Old North Sound, including Long Island, the plantations, lands, and houses formerly of John Lucy Blackman Bayer, Otter Bayer, and George Thomas, Esquires, and the plantation, lands, and houses, formerly of Benjamin Nibbs."

Sugar Mills

Barnacle Point 
Fort Byam, which guarded the Parham Harbour and was located at the very end of the Barnacle Point Estate, looked out over the water.

Once Bernie Entwhistle passed away, he entrusted Charles Curtis with the responsibility of managing Golden Grove, Barnacle Point, and Jolly Hill from the years 1801 through 1812.

1822: Charles Curtis returned to England, and his relative Janet Richards found a box of correspondence between him and Samuel Martin, which included 41 pages of Accounts of the Bertie Entwhistle Trust for the above estates from 1812-1822. In addition, the box contained a map of the Bertie Entwhistle estate. These narratives can provide a sense of what was going on at the estate during this time period by providing interesting tidbits of information that can be learned from them.

At the age of 69, Bertie Entwistle, who was a senior member of H.M. Council, passed away at sea on board the R.M.S. "Seine" while he was traveling back to Antigua from France. At the time of his passing, it was reported that he had a net worth of £35,000. There is additional material that can be found in two letter volumes that are stored with the Jarvis family papers at the University of Michigan. In 1829, this estate comprised 64 acres and was connected to another estate through a system of shared slaves.

Francis Shand (1800-1868), an absentee West Indian trader and ship owner from Liverpool, had a number of leases on local plantations before he got married. He did this before he got married. After tying the knot with Lydia Byam in the year 1837, he quickly rose through the ranks to become one of the most successful landowners in Antigua at the time. In addition to this, he had played a significant role in the negotiations over the terms of emancipation in England. The 1852 census listed the following among their properties: a 517 acre plantation at Martin's Byam or Fitche's Creek in St. George's Parish; a 230 acre estate at Mount Lucye, also in St. George's; a 128 acre plantation at Cedar Valley in St. John's parish; Harts & Royals, two estates consisting of 206 acres; the 90 acre Blizard estate; and a variety of other estates owned The union resulted in the birth of 13 children, one of whom, Charles Arthur Shand, would become their heir. By the middle of the 1980s, Fiche's Creek was the only property that remained.

An inventory of supplies, a profile of the hill the fort is on, and reports of hurricane damage are all included on a map of Fort Byam that was surveyed by Kane William Horneck (1725) and can be found at the John Carter Brown Library, which is located on the campus of Brown University in Providence, Rhode Island. In the collection of prints and artwork that previously belonged to Ben Quinn of Parham Hill, there is also a magnificent water color sketch of the Fort with a flag flying. A report on the current condition of the fortifications near the mouth of Parham Harbour, which are housed in a battery known as Byam Fort. Contains a report on the damage caused by the hurricane, a profile of the hill that the fort is situated on, and an inventory of the supplies that are available. It can be found in the John Carter Brown Library, which can be found on the campus of Brown University in Providence, Rhode Island. "The state of affairs at Fort Byam. The late hurricane caused the flag staff to be blown down, the guard house to sustain significant damage, and the ——— to be thrown down.

In addition, the Nibb's Family Burial Site was located at Barnacle Point, and records for it were kept there up until the year 1808. According to the data that was collected by Tombstone.bb in 2005, gravestones bearing the names Collins/William Hall and Collins/Mary Hall have been located as of the present day. Nibbs/Jeremiah and Bird/Ann were not found in the recorded results. When three headstones were moved by the backhoe in 2007, one of them belonged to the Nibbs family, and the other two belonged to Mr. Collins and his daughter. Dr. Reg Murphy was called in to investigate. They were replaced and buried as the gravestones were packed up and sent to Betty's Hope. There, they will be added to a collection of MI's from all over the island that were disturbed in the name of development by the ubiquitous backhoe. "Again, it's the first time I've ever seen someone buried with their name right on the coffin, and it is done in brass text and the copper, and it is because of that it survived and the fabric around it and the wood is nailed into survived so there's Jeremiah Nibbs and the date he died, born and died, perfectly preserved [inaudible]," the archaeologist said. Dr. Reg Murphy William Nibbs was laid to rest at "Barnacle Point" in the year 1832.

Barnacle Point is the land that is on the sea to the north and east of the airport. It was once held by R. Allen Stanford, who also owns Maiden Island. He is responsible for the construction of a restaurant, a docking space, and a maintenance facility for business jet aircraft. In 2010, Mr. Stanford was sentenced to prison in the state of Texas, United States of America, for his involvement in ponzi schemes involving offshore banking and banking in the United States. These schemes caused many people to go bankrupt, many employees to lose their jobs, and his properties to be contested. Receivership was granted for each and every one of his holdings in Antigua.

Barnes Hill 
There is no longer a mill at this location, and very little else but the name of the estate is left to identify it. Old-timers claim that it was situated at the most westerly point of Powell's road and that it was demolished when runway #10 was constructed in order to make room for low-flying planes. In the back of the settlement that bears its namesake at the top of the hill, there are still visible remnants of a few old little stone structures that are covered in wild coralita. As was the case with the most of the estates, the highest point or top of the hill was chosen as the location for construction in order to take advantage of the influence that the breeze had on providing cooling. Also, it made it possible for the planter to see out over the majority of the land. The result of this is that the residents of Barnes Hill now have breathtaking views to the north of the island, which overlook the water.

Maj. William Barnes was elected assembly speaker in 1678. In 1679, Jeremiah Watkins gave John Richardson 100 acres. 1680: Maj. William Barnes received a patent from Mr. William Yeamons for 237 acres. The Antigua Film Project includes a letter regarding my aunt, Mrs. Ann Barnes, which was written in 1681. Maj. William Barnes had a patent for 230 acres from William Stapleton. "I very well recall her husband Mr. William Barnes from my childhood in Antigua, and that she was his second wife is very certain because I very well know Mr. John Barnes now in New England who was a son of said William Barnes, deceased, and have heard of another son at Bristol, a soap boiler, but my Aunt Barnes had no living children of her own." Maj. William Barnes passed away in 1695 and was buried in the churchyard of Saint. George. He was the first settler to be interred within a church's sanctuary. In 1695, Will was proved. Anne Barnes was assigned 500 acres in the St. Mary's Vestry record in 1696. John Richardson of Parham left a will in 1705. Everything of my assets will go to my son John Richardson, and I'll pay £15 to have a 50' square grave on my plantation put out wall to wall. In the year 1718, I said to my wife Ann Thomas, "To my wife Ann Thomas £500 & £400/year so long as she stays my widow, only £100/year if she marry, likewise all plate, home goods, chariot and horses. I grant her access to 100 acres known as "Barnes" next to Mr. Francis Carlisle if she lives in Antigua. John Barnes sold his lands in New England in 1719 through an Act. John Richardson of "Barnes" in North Sound, the sole son and heir, passed away in 1734. Elizabeth Richardson of St. Martin, formerly of St. Martin and widow of John Richardson of Antigua, was born in 1792. "Doctor of Physick deceased," releases her dower rights to Thomas Jarvis and Daniel Hill of Antigua, Samuel Martin, Customs Collector for the Port of Saint John's, Antigua. 1827: On September 16, 1827, John Jarvis wrote a letter to GRP Jarvis. "He'll give his brother custody of his two sons". James Barrett, Fredericka Theresa, George Humphry, Lettice, John Prince, and William Henry are all listed as being between 1 month and 4 years old in the slave registry for John S. Jarvis from 1813 to 1834.

The Nibbs and High Point Plantations in Antigua were transferred in 1842 by Francis Wightwick, Esq., to Geor. Savage Martin and William Henry Martin, Esq., according to the West Indian Encumbered Estates Court. Francis Wightwick (from Surrey), Winifred Wightwick (a spinster from Surrey), George Savage, and William Henry Martin (from Antigua); High Point Plantation, which was formed by combining the Nibbs of Popeshead, High Point, Barnes Hill, and Ronans plantations. The event is depicted in Christian Work, November 1, 1871 - Mission Field in the year 1871. Every estate in my parish has suffered greatly, and every chimney has been torn down, according to the bishop of Antigua. The day after the hurricane, I laid to rest eleven people who had died, and the following two days, three more died as a result of their injuries. In Barnes Hill, the same scene played out as I personally distributed every day 320 small loaves and 100 pieces of salt fish, and sickness is now, sadly, beginning to abound. On Monday night, over 300 people sat up together in the open air, exposed to relentless and drenching rains in St. Mark's village. The brand-new benches and lamps in the Barnes Hill School Chapel are completely wrecked and scattered to the winds. The entire community, which has 700 residents, is in utter disrepair. On October 5, 1889, it was published in the British Medical Journal. At the time, he served as the government medical officer. He reasoned that "some very particular form of poison of infrequent occurrence eaten in combination with food" must be responsible. He continues, "The main food of the negroes and lower classes here has been a salted fish called cod for decades past, but it might be anything else. It is brought in from the United States. I can honestly state that, in my capacity as a health officer, it doesn't always get there or keep her completely sweet, nor did the effluvium from this food ever strongly remind me of the hay-fields of England. Dr. John Freeland calculated that there were 53 lepers in Antigua in 1890; the leper colony housed 12 males and 19 women. On October 30, 1819, Dr. Freeland married Miss Eleanor Foote. Interesting to note is that Freida Cassin's "With Quiet Tread," published in 1890, is regarded as the first novel set in Antigua and Barbuda. It is a book about leprosy.

Cassin, an Antiguan Creole, also launched the "Carib," a six-issue literary journal, in 1895. 1 August 1943 The Gunthorpes Estates, Ltd. underwent restructuring and was renamed Antigua Syndicate Estates, Ltd. (see #64 Gunthorpe's). In 1947, negotiations with Mary Camacho for Carlisle and a portion of Barnes Hill failed. Nonetheless, there was significant encroachment in 1949 that had to be acknowledged in order to permit the transfer of the estate, including Carlisle's, to the Syndicate Estates. According to the ASE minutes, the transfer cost $2,500 and happened on February 25, 1949. The Antigua and Barbuda Syndicate Estates Ltd (Vesting) Act and The Lands of Antigua and Barbuda Sugar Factory, Limited, both passed laws on December 30, 1969. 24. The entire 27.21-acre plot of land that is a portion of Barnes Hill and is described in the certificate of title no. 251949, dated August 20, 1949, and entered in Register Book S Folio 19. taken from Barnes Hill's history. According to records, William Barnes, a young English settler who was born in December 1656 and died in November 1695, was honored with the village's name. Barnes holds the distinction of being the first settler to be buried in a church, Fitches Creek's St. George's Anglican Church. In the far western end of Powell's road, in the Barnes Hill hamlet, there was a substantial sugar mill and one of the earliest police stations. In order to allow aircraft approaching Runway 10 from practically direct overhead flight, this mill was dismantled. Two of the three significant lime kilns in the nation were also located in the hamlet. White lime produced by the projects is utilized in building and in the management of human waste. For many years, white lime was also used to paint walls. to play goals in football and mark the creases for cricket matches, respectively. Sun Valley, the fourth steel band to be founded in Antigua and Barbuda after Hell's Gate, Brute Force, and Red Army, was produced by Barnes Hill. Manning and Vincent Freeland, among others, will swear to the fact that splinters from the dreaded "country band" were responsible for the formation of North Stars of New Winthorpes and Rising Sun of Pigotts. At one point, "Bum" was used to describe two elite players. Brute Force's "Bum" Jardine and Barnes Hill's Roy "Bum/Bumpers" Solomon.

Blackman's/Mount Lucie 
Blackman's is located in Parham Harbour, with its northernmost shores not far from Sir Vivian Richard's Stadium, which is to the south. There is no proof that this estate ever switched to steam at the mill, which is currently held by the Shoul family. The mill is still there and in good condition, but it is covered in honey bees (old deserted mills often house bees and the honey gets collected by those in the know). The buff house was still standing as of the late 1990s, although it had suffered serious termite damage and collapsed after the last hurricane, leaving just the stone steps and bottom storey together with some of the surrounding garden walls. There was a building to the east of the main house, possibly where the works were, that had been rebuilt and was still in reasonably good shape in 2000. The place is currently entirely encircled by jungle.

The location of this mill was perfect for delivering sugar straight from the estate in the past rather than taking the more time-consuming trek overland by ox and cart. For 130 slaves, Mount Lucy or Blackman's received £2043 7 s 10 d. Just William Henry Rowland Irby received the honor.

The name "Lucie" was adopted by John Blackman (b. 1676–1726) from Blackman of Mount Lucie estates in Barbados and Antigua. In 1678, Lucie Blackman, the second son, established plantations in Jamaica, Antigua, and Barbados. John Lucie Blackman, 1705 Gent. John Johnson's 6 acres of property are located on the western bank of Fitche's Creek. John Lucie and Francis Blackman got hitched. Their 6-month-old boy is buried in St. George's cemetery after passing away in June 1700. Elizabeth Lucie, John Lucie's daughter, received half of the plantation in Antigua and the plantation in Barbados when her father passed away. Nonetheless, all of the properties passed to the testator's nephew Lucie Blackman when she married Gerard Napier. (c.1686) On August 16, 1703, Richard Scott of Barbados, Esq., sold a slave to John Lucye Blackman of Antigua, Esq., for £100 sterling. 1703: Blackman's manager, Giles Watkins, Esq. 1715/16 March 9: John Lucie Blackman requests a patent for a tiny island and claims that he has been seized of a patch of mangroves and flashes on the west bank of Fitche's Creek starting at the old bridge since July 1760. Overall 6 acres, etc. Rowland, the son of Hon. Lucie Blackman, received a bequest in her will in 1724. Moreover, £20 was left to buy a plate for St. George's Church. According to the John Luffman map from 1777–1778, Blackman's was formerly known as Mt. Lucie Plantation and was possessed by Heirs of Blackman's. Via his mother Mary Blackman, who was Rowland Blackman's daughter, William Henry Rowland Irby received the estate of Blackman between 1784 and 1842.

Thomas Niehell leases to Francis Bell Grant 88 1/2 acres in St. St. Joseph's parish beginning on May 26 for a period of six years at a rent of 104 pounds. Tyrell Herbert served as the captain of Barnacle Point's Fort Byam in 1792. Valentine Morris (d. 1789) named him and William Taylor as his executors in 1788 for his West Indian estate. He owned the Crabb's estate, Looby's, which had an £8080 mortgage on it, and Jolly Hill at the time, and he was extremely embarrassed by his problems. See Ravenscroft v. Frisby for intriguing details of a case from Chancery 1844, which occurred forty years later. 1820: In a codicil to his will in 1820, William Henry Irby granted an annuity of £200 per annum to his daughter Augusta Priscilla, widow of Sir William Langham of Cottesbrooke, expressing regret that high taxes following Napoleonic wars and many other calamities attendant upon his West Indian property he was leaving to his son (eg. Poor harvests, hurricanes, etc.) prevented him providing for her more fully without injuring the property he was leaving to his son. He expressed the optimism that the estate would make a comeback to sustain their significant debt. Blackman's, then known as Mount Lucye, acquired 330 acres and 138 slaves in 1829. The Blackman Estate's former slaves used to craft whistles from bamboo or wild cane. The whistle is also used to create music. They celebrated the first of August in that manner.

1851: The Antigua Almanac lists Messrs. W. & F. Shand as the owners of Blackman's 230 acres. Owner of Paynter's, Orange Valley, Bodkin's, Blackman's Mt. Lucy, and Room's was Kean Brown Osborn, M.D. (1770–1852). In the will, Carlisle's and Paynter's were connected. 1870: "A conditional order for the sale of an estate called Blackman's or Mount Lucy, in the island of Antigua, with objections being submitted on behalf of the owners," Solicitor's Journal & Reporter, December 24, 1870. The estate once belonged to Dr. Osborne, who divided it (together with other trustees) to transfer for fifty years in trust out of the rents and earnings in order to raise and pay certain specified debts in aid of his personal estate. Dr. Osborne passed away in 1852 after dividing it in this manner. His wife received the estate for life, after which it would pass to their son. Estates Court with debts.

Cane Returns for the 1941 Crop from Antigua Sugar Factory, Ltd. Blackman's. 2049 tons estimated, 107 acres of farmland with peasants, and 1759 tons of cane delivered at a rate of 16.44 tons per acre. 1949: There was a lot of encroachment while Mrs. Camacho was trying to transfer the estate of Carlisle (#60) and Barnes Hill. Nonetheless, it was sold for $2,500 to the Syndicate Estates on February 25, 1949. V.C. Gomes was Blackman's owner in 1951. 2016: The Antiguan government approved Blackman's Estate for the CIP Program (Citizens by Investment Act 2013). The real estate option's approved investment amount is $400 000 US plus costs. 1957: Mr. C.T. Michael, the Syndicate's overseer at Carlisle's for the previous year, passed away. The Firm also had maintenance duties for the estate homes that were used as homes.

Carlisle’s 
There is no evidence that this estate switched to steam, and the mill still stands. One of the modest, old stone outbuildings that is still being used as a home sits next to the mill. The original estate home is no longer visible, and the entire hillside has been developed into a neighborhood. The V.C. Bird International Airport's whole runway is visible from the top of the hill where the mill is located, overlooking Winthorpe's former village and estate.

The land that today makes up this estate was formerly Stokes land, which was a portion of Winthorpe's estate that was sold to Major William Barnes, who then sold it to Captain Francis Carlisle. Another reminder of the Carlisle family's impact on the island in the early 1700s is the Carlisle Bay, which is located on the south side of the island close to Old Road, St. Mary's. The Carlisle Bay Hotel is located on a lovely sand beach that stretches across the bay. In 1678, Major William Barnes sold Captain Francis Carlisle 150 acres of "Stotes Land" that he had purchased from Winthrop. When Major William Barnes of Millend, Stepney, passed away in 1694, a portion of his testament was written down in Antigua. To my beloved wife, Mrs. Ursula Barnes, 1/2 of the plantation's annual revenues and 1/3 of the debt owed to me by Captain Francis Carlisle of Antigua. Along with that, he bequeathed his son William Barnes II £1200, along with "the plantation [Barnes Hill] I bestowed on my wife when I married her and 25 Africans" when he was 21 years old. According to legend, several members of the house of assembly stood around reviling and insulting Colonel Parke, Governor of Antigua, as he suffered the agonies of a "dismembered body" in 1706.

These individuals are said to have included Andrew Murray, Francis Carlisle, Mr. Tomlinson, and Captain Painter. 500 acres in New North Sound belonged to Col. Francis Carlisle, a member of H.M. Council, and he gave them to his son William in 1709. July 2, Frances Carlisle has a 300-acre property in New North Sound that is bordered on the west by Cassada Garden, etc. Elizabeth McKinnon was married to William Carlisle (d. 1738), and after his passing, he gave her all of his personal belongings and available funds. She then wed John Gray of Scotland, a young man, and bequeathed him everything, which was between £25,000 and £30,000, when she passed away. Nonetheless, the Carlisle Estate was kept within the family. William Carlisle, the son of the first union, passed away in Antigua about 1744 while still single, leaving his estate to his sister Alice, who wed Ralph Payne (1706–1762) of St. Kitts. Ralph Payne (1739–1807), their son, received Carlisle's. Carlisle's Estate received £5168 19 s 4 d as compensation for 395 slaves. Former owners Ralph Payne, Neville Reid, and John Dixon received awards, as did the first Lord Lavington. Will on November 1, 1742. I want my mother to leave the estate to my first nephew Ralph (Payne) and his successors, and I'm leaving all of my possessions to my lovely mother Eliz. Carlisle.

Sir Ralph Payne, Lord Lavington, passed away childless in 1807 at the age of 69 in Government House in Antigua. The legislature granted his wife £300 annually until her death at Hampton Court Palace on May 2, 1830. His bones were buried in the garden of Carlisle's Estate at a location he had specifically indicated for that purpose not long before he passed away. His career followed the ascent and fall of British absentee sugar planters. He served in the British Parliament, was given the Order of the Bath's ensigns, and was a Senior Knight at the time of his passing. He received the titles of Clerk of The Board of Green Cloth in 1775, Captain-General and Governor of the Leeward Islands in 1771, Captain-General and Governor of the Leeward Islands in 1771, and Baron Lavington in 1795, advancing him to the Peerage of the Kingdom of Ireland. His Lordship once more received the titles of Captain-General, Governor in Chief, and Vice Admiral of the Leeward Islands in 1801, and he was also sworn in as a member of the King's Privy Council. The people of Antigua were profoundly affected by his outstanding conduct in the performance of his duties. Caribbean West Thomas Hearne, the artist who created many of the paintings that portray Antigua at this time, is another artist who Ralph Payne is well known for supporting. The Beiniecke collection can be found at Yale University.

1838: Manning & Anderdon of the New Bank Building in London, England, appointed David "Judge" Cranstoun as their authentic and legitimate counsel for the purchase of the Carlisle Estate. John Proctor Anderdon, William Manning, and Fredrick Manning. The precise date of acquisition is unknown. 1852: Kean Osborn, M.D., owned Orange Valley, which encompassed 735 acres in St. Mary's, Bodkin, which encompassed 412 acres in St. Paul's, Room, which encompassed 318 acres in St. Paul's, Paynter, which encompassed 272 acres, and Carlisle, which encompassed 388 acres in St. George's. Carlisle's estate included 388 acres and 365 slaves in 1852. Kean Brown Osborn, M.D. held Paynters, Orange Valley, Bodkins, Blackman's/Mt. Lucy, and Rooms, totaling 272 acres. In the will, Carlisle's and Paynter's were connected.

1884: Charles John Manning, a West Indian trader and the son of William Manning (1777–1835) and Mary Hunter, received payment for Upper and Lower Walrond in Antigua as a result of the marriage settlement between Bethell Walrond and Lady Janet St. Claire. His father, William Manning, was a prominent figure in the West India lobby, a West Indian trader, and a landowner in St. Kitts. He was given claims for slaves owned on the Lower and Upper Walrond Estates (claim No. 79) and the Little Duers (claim No. 259). Caribbean T71/877. At his death, he had £70,000 in assets. In 1948, Syndicates Estates, Ltd. purchased Carlisle's Estate. In 1951, Syndicate was leasing 2,202 renters across 1,631 acres of property, of which 974 tenants across 1,454 acres may be freed from the Company's grasp while the remaining tenants would need to find new homes. 1949: to facilitate the estate's transfer revealed that there had been a significant incursion. The move cost £2,500 and happened on February 25, 1949. 1951's Antigua Almanac lists K.B. Osborn, M.D. as the owner of the 388-acre Carlisle's property.

1957: The overseer at Carlisle's for the previous year, Mr. C.T. Michael, passed away. The ASE Board Minutes from that period indicate that the Syndicate company was responsible for maintaining the estate houses, which were in a poor state of condition. The business and A. de Souza Jardine agreed to a $500 sale of the projected 1 1/2-acre house site on the west side of the base road in September 1960. The company also sold the government 1.357 acres of Carlisle land for $3,000 on December 23, 1960, to be utilized for the new airport. 1939: To visit Carlton and Ena Moore, the Lake kids used to go from the Antigua Sugar Plant and take a shortcut through Pigott's Village. A few distance past the Army Base West gate sat the large home. The grave was situated in the center of a former canefield, close to the settlement and the road that connected it to the hilltop Great House. "We frequently made a stop there. A fence made of iron worked around it. I suppose that in addition to Lavingtons, Lord Lavington owned Carlisle's. Lavingtons had Douglas Holmes A'court, Sr. as manager at the time, and we occasionally went there as well. Other from the site of the cemetery, the only other thing I can recall about Lord Lavington is that he gave his name to a nearby plant that is now known as Lord Lavington. The Lord Lavington leaves and lard concoction was used by peasant toothache sufferers to bind their jaw. At that time, there weren't many dentists on the island."

The Gunthorpes Estates, Ltd. underwent a restructuring on August 1, 1943 (see #64 Gunthorpe's), and was called Antigua Syndicate Estates Ltd. 1947: Talks with Mary Camacho regarding Carlisle and a portion of Barnes Hill failed. 1950s: Jack Vanier formerly resided in the vintage buff home. One evening while relaxing on the porch, he felt the shackles tighten around his head and a chill spread through him. He kept getting the impression that someone was looking at him with malice. He turned and saw a white-clad woman who was immobile. When he eventually stood up and walked over to her, she vanished into thin air. Later, he learned that the family had buried their money and that it was customary to have a slave dig the grave before being executed. The young woman was killed by the slave this time, and she kept coming back to look for her money. Meryl Kelsick. Barnes Hill and Mrs. Mary T. Camacho sold to the Syndicate Estates in 1948. (Tenancy areas) ASE had been renting out 1,101 tenants on 1,631 acres of property. Of these, 974 occupants on 1,454 acres may be detached from the Company's hold, while the remaining renters would need to find new housing. There was significant encroachment that needed to be corrected in order to permit the transfer of the land. The move cost $2,500 and happened on February 25, 1949.

The Antigua and Barbuda Syndicate Estates, Limited (Vesting) Act and the Lands of Antigua and Barbuda Sugar Factories Limited were passed on December 30, 1969. According to the Certificate of Title, the entire 129.6-acre chunk of land that is a part of Carlisle.

Date Hill 
The mill that sits on this property is in pristine shape and was once a part of the Sugar Mill Hotel. While the hotel was operational, it served as a bar for guests. R. Allen Stanford bought the land, and after that, he had everything on the property destroyed with the exception of the mill. Date Hill, like the majority of the estates, was constructed on a hill and had sweeping views of the surrounding area, including all of the offshore islands and estates belonging to Nibb, High Point, and Winthorpe. A breathtaking panorama, especially when one considers the fact that storms often approach from the north-eastern direction. During its prime, this farm was also responsible for the cultivation of ground supplies.

Thomas Sheppard or Shepherd was a landowner in the past, both in Pennsylvania and in Antigua, where he was known as Date Hill. The fact that Lydia Byam (1768-1856) of Cedar Valley Plantation was the granddaughter of Thomas Sheppard, a Quaker, explains the breadth and depth of her education as well as her range of interests. Lydia Byam kept a diary from the time she was 18 to 19 years old when she was still living with her parents at Cedar Hill, and Gay Byam inherited that diary. Date Hill was one of the plantations that she frequently visited, and she provided a magnificent account of the property in her journal, focusing on the breathtaking view that it offered of the North Shore Islands, in particular Long Island and Maiden Island.

In a letter dated July 8, 1828, Mrs. Sutton received the following passage from her cousin Ann Byam's correspondence with her: "I have agreeably to your desire held a long conversation with my friend Sarah Freeman concerning the people at Date Hill, who were all disposed of separately from the Land and Buildings on the estate, except Margaret, who would not quit her home and property, and being advanced in years they consented to her remaining there." Mrs. Kentish adopted a daughter and her child after purchasing one of her daughters. She is quite fond of them and pays a great deal of attention to Margaret, who pays a visit to them on a regular basis. To clarify, this refers to Mrs. Kentish here. It turned out that she was Octavia Wyke, and one of her daughters had only recently married a physician named Anderson from the island of Trinidad.

1829: This plantation comprised 132 acres and shared its slaves with another estate in the vicinity.

"On one occasion, my master and mistress went into the country to Date Hill for a change of air, and they carried me with them to take charge of the children, as well as to do the work that needed to be done about the house. During my time in Antigua, I was able to observe the working conditions of the country's negroes in the fields. They put in a lot of labor yet get relatively little food to eat. They are awakened before dawn to be sent to work, and they do not return to their homes until after nightfall. After that, each person is responsible for carrying a bundle of grass into the enclosure for the cattle. After that, on Sunday morning, each slave is required to go outside and gather a large bundle of grass; and, when they bring it home, they are all required to sit at the manager's door and wait until he comes out; frequently, they are required to wait there until after eleven in the morning without any breakfast. Following that, those who have yams or potatoes, or firewood, to sell hasten to the market to purchase a dog's worth (10) of salt fish, or pork, which is an excellent reward for them. Some of them purchase what they refer to as sauce, which is actually a small amount of pickle, from the shad barrels so that they can season their yams and Indian corn. I am aware that working or going to market on Sunday is a grave sin; nevertheless, given that the Buckra men do not provide their slaves with any other day, do you not think that God will hold them accountable for this on the great day of judgment? The holiday of Christmas arrived while we were at Date Hill, and the slave woman who was in charge of taking care of the location (which at the time belonged to Mr. Roberts, the marshal) asked me to accompany her to her husband's home, where they were attending a Methodist meeting for prayer at a plantation known as Winthorp's. I attended, and the prayers that were said there were the first ones I had ever comprehended. One of the women said a prayer, and then everyone sang a hymn. After that, there was another prayer, and then everyone sang another hymn. After that, each person took it in turn to speak about their own struggles as sinners. The man who drove us there was the black spouse of the woman I was with. Henry was his given name. He admitted that he had been quite abusive to the slaves, but he claimed that he was forced to execute the orders of his owner. He made this confession under oath. He begged for forgiveness from each of them, as well as from God, and he prayed that God would forgive him. He stated that it was a horrible thing for a ranger to sometimes be required to beat his own wife or sister, but that he was required to do so if it was ordered by his master. The following is an excerpt from Mary Prince's History."

1824: A notice proclaiming the dissolution of the partnership between Dudley Semper and Charles Robertson, which had been operating under the name of Charles Robertson & Co. in Montserrat and Antigua, is published. "Any parties who have any demands against either of the aforementioned firms are hereby requested to present their accounts to the aforementioned Charles Robertson, who has agreed to settle and pay the same," it is said in the request.

Slaves, being real estate, do not pass as under the order and disposition of the bankrupt, but they can be the subject of an equitable mortgage since they do not pass as under the order and disposition of the bankrupt. 1834: "The bankrupts carried on business as West India merchants prior to November 1831; and on the 5th of August in the same year, the petitioners lends them £1,000 and also accepted accommodation bills for £4,000; and as a security the deeds of a plantation in Antigua, and the slaves thereon were deposited with them, by way of equitable mortgage; and accompanied by the following memorandum: "Dear Sirs, We have the honor to acknowledge that We hereby deposit and pledge with you the conveyance to us, for a valuable consideration, of the plantation called Yeaman's, in the island of Antigua, together with the slaves thereon, and premises. This is in consideration of your having accepted our three separate drafts upon you for £1,000, £1,000 and £2,000 dated this day, at one month, to our own order, due 5th and 8 September, and at the same time of your having lent us in cash the sum of On July 10, 1827, C. Robertson and Eliza, his wife, carried out the execution, and the document was recorded on the same day. In the Slave Registry for the years 1813-1814, the name Charles Robertson is included. In addition, it is mentioned that by the year 1821, Phillip Lyne had already sold 146 persons into slavery to Charles Robertson.

The Heirs of Chas. Robertson were the owners of the 122 acres that made up Date Hill in 1851, according to the Antigua Almanac. Cane Returns for the 1941 Crop at Winthorpe's and Date Hill, as Reported by the Antigua Sugar Plant, Ltd. in 1941. 953 tons, 70 acres of estate, 3 acres of peasant land on the estate, 738 tons of cane provided at a rate of 10.25 tons per acre estimated total yield 953 tons. In 1986, Brian Gonsalves was the owner of the Sugar Mill Hotel and managed its operations.

When the Muhammad and Malvo shooting occurred in Alabama in 2002, Brian Gonsalves was serving as the Director of Internal Security in Antigua at the time. It was later determined that there was a connection to Antigua, which is where Muhammad and Malvo may have met. R. Allen Stanford b.1950. Spending 110 years in a penitentiary in Texas for fraud in a large Ponzi scheme, had developed the area around the airport terminal and had lately purchased the Date Hill site across the road from the airport. The passage of time did not permit progress.

Donovan’s (Vaughan’s) 
This location still has a mill, a cattle enclosure, various walls, and several sizable ponds that are now populated with pink water lilies. Donovan's and Gunthorpe's were united when Gunthorpe's was upgraded to steam. Weir's estate is to the north-west, Blackman's and Cedar Hill (Lower) are to the north-east, and North Sound is to the south. The Sir Viv Richards Cricket Stadium is currently situated directly south of the estate. For ever paying one ear of Indian corn, Thomas Vaughan received 600. Col. James, Governor.

Col. James Vaughan sold 500 acres to Mr. Duncombe and his wife Hannah at St. John's (1679–1680).

600 acres in Antigua are sold by Walter Symonds of Nevis, Esq., to Col. James Vaughn in 1680.

1681: James Vaughn's Will (d.1683). "Inventory of bills owing as stated in my books, 450 acres in the Body, 20 slaves, and 3 pickaninnies as listed."

The property in St. George's parish that is today known as Donovan's, originally known as Vaughan's, was owned by Capt. John Otto Baijer in 1715. It appears that the initials BOB were carved over a door to record the year Baijer Otto Baijer, Esq. erected the residence. The estate still has a sizable windmill and a walled family graveyard that was apparently constructed by the Donovans, although there are no signs of any gravestones.

1730: "In 1730, Frances Vaughn reclaimed her grandfather's Antiguan farms" (Oliver 171). With Frances Vaughn, an agreement. All the lands that made up Roger Williams' plantation in St. John's and New Division in Antigua, containing 470 or 500 acres, were bordered on the north by the lands sold by James Vaughn to Thomas Duncombe, on the south by the lands formerly owned by Luke Child and John Cohen and now or previously in the possession of William Horne, on the west by the lands formerly owned by one Fletcher and on the east by the lands formerly owned by John.

James Donovan purchased "Vaughan's" in 1785 from Rowland Otto-Baijer. The letters "B.O.B." Bastion Otto Baijer are carved on the mill (father).

This estate had 247 acres and 154 slaves in 1829. 162 slaves and £2,474 16 s 10 d. Records reveal Richard Donovan as the former owner and 'no name' awardee.

Francis Shand, a West India merchant from Woolton Wood in Liverpool, had sizable estates in Antigua in 1837. At St. Georges, he wed Lydia Byam of Cedar Hill in 1837. London hosted the Encumbrance Estate Act. For £1500, one can purchase the 247-acre Donovan's Estate in the Parish of St. George on the island of Antigua. Mr. Francis Shand from Liverpool was the buyer. Mr. Watkins was the estate manager for Donovan (coloured). "We discovered the sugar works to be in full swing; the windmill's wide wings were turning steadily, and thick volumes of smoke were coming from the boiling house's chimney. Some of the black people were used to transport cane to the mill, while others were used to remove garbage, or megasse, as the cane is known after the juice has been extracted from it. Others were breaking apart the megasse and scattering it on the ground to dry, primarily the elderly men and women. The sugar is solely heated using this fuel. We found three planters inside the home when we first arrived, whom Mr. W had invited to join us for breakfast. The gathering of several knowledgeable, practical planters provided a fantastic opportunity for them to compare their viewpoints. There was a striking coincidence on all the key issues pertaining to the operation of freedom. When breakfast was served, Mrs. W. came into the room and sat down at the head of the table after we introduced her. She presided at the table with wonderful grace and dignity, and she had sophisticated discourse and impeccable manners.

Documents, correspondence, and plans from 1777 to 1892. The Two Donovan's, father and son, wrote to the Home Government slandering the Courts of Judicature at Antigua, and to this accusation, Chief Justice Burton refuted: "That Mr. Jas. Donovan, when he knew him, was a clerk in the Marshal's Office, then set up a huckster's shop for the sale of rum, sugar, and provisions (often stolen by slaves from their masters and sold to him), and so acquired money to purchase the estate he now possesses. Mr. Geo. Donovan, whose son is a member of the Antigua bar, was jailed for libel and for attempting to persuade witnesses to lie. The elder Donovan was also referred to by the Assembly as "an obscure, illiterate guy without competent means, and risen from poverty to wealth."

The Encumbered Estates Acts of 1854 and 1858 say that J. Donovan's 247 acres go to his heirs, according to the Antigua Almanac from 1851. The lawsuit involving Donovan's that was brought before the English courts is provided here, along with some background information about the family's line of descent. West Indians felt that the fact that the cases were heard in London was not in their favor and that many cases were heard without adequate representation. In this instance, a conditional order had been imposed to sell the estate "Donovan's" on the island of Antigua. This property was once owned by James Donovan, who passed away in 1811 and left it to his son Richard for life, with a remainder to James Hancock Donovan for life and an eventual remainder to Richard Donovan in fee (after some constraints failed). Under his will, Richard Donovan left Caroline Scott the estate for life, with her first son and later sons inheriting the remainder. James Hancock Donovan passed away in 1834, Richard Donovan died in 1816, and Caroline Scott's eldest son, Honeywood Scott, is the current owner. A lawsuit was filed in the Island Court of Chancery on behalf of James Hancock Donovan, who was still a child, after Richard Donovan passed away in 1816. A receiver was also appointed. Another lawsuit was started in 1833 to determine the priorities of several encumbrances affecting the estate. There was a lot of litigation, which led to an appeal to the Privy Council. By order of the Privy Council issued in 1839, it was determined that certain legatees under the will of James Donovan, who claimed legacies totaling roughly £3,700, were subordinate to Messrs. Shand for any amount over £10,000 on the estate. The proceeds from the estate, which had been in the care of a receiver since 1816, had been used to reduce the debt owed by Messrs. Shand to some extent and to keep the interest on the above charges down, but the remaining balance due on that debt totaled more than £6,000, and the legacies remained unpaid. Since the estate had been managed by the receiver only for the advantage of the encumbrancers, nothing had been received by anyone claiming to be the owner for a very long time. When the initial encumbrancer, Messrs. Shand, requested a sale in January 1865 in order to collect the debt's principal, a conditional order was made in response. THE APPENDIX. A notice of opposition to the conditional order was then filed by Mr. Heagan, who claimed to be one of the legatees listed above, on the grounds that a sale would be unfair and unnecessary. He also presented a petition under the 12th General Rule for the transfer of the proceedings to the Court of the Local Commission, and both of the aforementioned matters were now set for hearing. On the petition for transfer, it was argued on behalf of Mr. Heagan that the legatees he was representing lived on the island and were unable to afford to retain agents or solicitors in England. Since Messrs. Shand were required to maintain agents on the island, it could not be detrimental to them to conduct the proceedings in the Local Court, it was claimed. Regarding the second issue, the opposition to the conditional order, Mr. Heagan argued that there was no justification for a sale because the estate was capable of "paying its way," that is, of keeping the interest on the encumbrances, in good times, and that it had only failed to do so over the past three years as a result of the exceptional drought. It was argued on behalf of Messrs. Shand that they had the right to select their own court as petitioners on the first point and the right to request the payment of their principal as well as their interest on the second issue. They would bear the risk and, if the current system were to be maintained, others would gain (if any). According to the evidence, it cost £150 every year to pass the receiver's accounts for this estate in the Island Court of Chancery, but it was hoped that thanks to a recent change, it would only cost £90 in the future. Waddy spoke in place of Mr. Heagan. In support of Mr. Shand, the petitioner, Archibald Smith appeared. On Tuesday in London, the following sales were conducted by the West India Encumbered Estates Court: For £1500, you can purchase the 247-acre Donovan's Estate in the parish of St. George on the island of Antigua. Mr. Francis Shand of Liverpool was the buyer. Refer to the Liverpool Mercury article from November 23, 1865. By the middle of the 1890s, the Shands were bankrupt and sold Cassandra Gardens and Donovan's together for £10,000. G.A. Macandrew, a businessman with a base in Liverpool who had served as the Shand's agent, bought it. Because of his long-standing connections to Antigua, Macandrew took over the Shands' role as the Diamond Estate's lessor in 1878 and became its owner by 1891.

Robert and George Gray MacAndrew (also of Liverpool) held a portion of the Lancastrian, a 443-foot-long barque that was built in 1861 and beached in 1881. This time frame corresponds roughly to the same one in which GA/GG Macandrew were at Antigua, as the accompanying video on the boat's history states. The Lancastria sailed for Antigua once more in June 1878 and returned to Liverpool in early October. Yet in February 1879, as she was anchored in Antigua Harbor, something happened that was reported to the Royal Humane Society in London. This occurred when a medal was awarded to Charles William Scott for saving a fellow crew member from drowning. According to the report, on February 18, Scott and Thomas H. Botham of the barque Lancastria, which was at the time anchored in Antigua Harbour, were transporting some hogsheads of sugar from the ship to the shore in a boat when the former somehow capsized into the water. He was unable to swim and would have drowned if Scott hadn't intervened. Scott had a difficult time getting out of a precarious situation between the hogsheads and the side of the boat after suffering serious injuries. He managed to grab hold of the drowning man with the help of one of the oars before swimming with him to shore, where they were both picked up quite fatigued.

1918: Cane cutters were halted at Morris Looby's, Donovan's, Millar's, and Cassandra Garden during the 1918 riots by bands of men.

Three DuBuissons (James Memoth DuBuisson, Mrs. Edith Manus DuBuisson, and William Herman DuBuisson), Alexander Moody-Stuart, and Judith Gwendolyn Moody-Stuart received 18,000 shares of the Antigua Sugar Estates at a price of £1 apiece in 1940. When George Moody-Stuart was offered shares but turned them down, it represented the ultimate transition to the next generation (Antigua Syndicate Estates minutes, 4 January 1940; 1 May 1940). The "Gunthorpe's" estates, including Cassada Garden, Paynter's, Tomlinson's, Fitche's Creek, Donovan's, Gunthorpe's, North Sound, Cedar Valley, Galley Bay, and Five Islands, would be under the authority of the new corporation.

"In accordance with custom at the time, Rupert "Myson" James of Parham was reared by foster parents rather than his own parents after being born at Donovans in 1929. His mother was a domestic worker who worked for two weeks straight without a Sunday off. His father drove mules for a living. The cane-filled carts were pulled by oxen, which were castrated bulls, and mules, and wages were paid in the currency of the day—pounds, shillings, and pence. They would remark "they hit the bull" if they made 15 during a good week. Everyone pitched in during crop time to cut and pack the cane, but they didn't return home at night. They remained in a negga hut, which was formerly a slave hut prior to 1831. They also worked a "negga groun" and kept cows for the purpose of selling their milk in order to make ends meet. They would plant cane, yams, pumpkins, potatoes, and other crops there. Some of these they retained for themselves, others they sold, and still others they traded with neighbors in exchange for meat if the neighbor had slain a pig or a goat. Everyone back then enjoyed fishing, therefore there were always fish in the pot. Back then, bamboo was used to make fish pots, and the men would plait the bamboo while seated in the moonlight. Later, the wire was used by others. The pots were identified by a buoy made of a light wood that was fastened to a collar made of mangrove wood and then fastened to the pot. Nobody stole back then, except maybe if they were going to cook lunch on one of the islands and needed a couple of fish. But, your pot was safe. As you dropped it, you used the land to get your bearings and lined up two landmarks in opposite directions so that once you did, you could still locate your pot without the buoy. The fishermen typically had someone sell their catch for them, such "the Reefer" or Uncle Ben, who employed Miss Humphryes, a fisherwoman from the village of Freeman, to do so. This position was known as a "whaler." She would receive her dinner's fish along with a 1 cent discount for each pound of fish she sold. When she returned the next week to pick up her fish, she would pay the amount she had accumulated over the previous week, which was saved as box money. As there were no banks for the poor, we had someone keep the box while recording everything in a book. When you needed money, you could take it out of the box."

Fitches’ Creek 
The estate land has been transformed into a somewhat affluent private house complex in place of the once-existent mill. St. George's Anglican Church, one of the island's oldest churches, was constructed in 1687 on property given to Daniel Fitch and is located in Fitches' Creek. This church has undergone multiple reconstructions following hurricane damage. The neighborhood is rumored to be haunted; a very irate young man has been spotted repeatedly pacing back and forth outside the churchyard's wall.

According to legend, the estate home and works were located on a hill beyond Fitches' Creek. From there, they would have had a panoramic view of the surrounding country, the sea, and the trade winds (as indicated by the icon in the image). The buff house is supposed to have been on a hill to the right of the works, which is now a residential neighborhood. There are still some ruins in the bush and the estate's pond at the base of the hill. When converted to steam, this estate, with more than 500 acres, was one of the biggest on the island.

November 30, 1666. After learning that 900 Englishmen from the nearby islands of Barbuda and Nevis under the command of Col. Daniel Fitch have gathered in the area's northern district (Pope's Head), eleven French vessels sailing under Clodore from Saint Kitts return to Saint John's Harbour (Antigua) with nearly 1,000 men. Although though many English inhabitants gave their parole when Antigua submitted to the French, Fitch's ranks today include a sizable number of them. So, the French commander sets course for Pope's Head and disembarks his little army with the assistance of Pierre Hencelin and Blondel. He then charges into the disorganized English force and scatters its members back onboard ship, all without incurring a single casualty. After having done so, Clodore advances in the direction of Martinique.

Leaving Surinam, Byam described how he had "deserted our unhappy colony of Surinam, war and pestilence having nearly eaten it," in a letter to a friend sent in 1668. I have relocated to Antigua at tremendous financial loss in order to carve a new fortune out of the untamed woods because the Dutch are about to take over. Even though he was resilient, he was soon appointed governor of Antigua, and Charles II's royal patent of 1668 gave him back the properties that were the cornerstone of the family fortunes: Cedar Hill, North Sound, and Willoughby Bay. Willoughby Bay was regarded as "the best cultivated and most fruitful" and the "prettiest of all the plantations in Antigua," allegedly situated in the most fertile region of the island.

"Here lyes the Body of William Barnes, Aged 34 years Born in December Anno 1656 and depart'd this Life ye 16th November, 1695, As also the Body of Phillip Barnes Born the 4th June Anno 1695, Who depart'd this Life 26th March, 1697," reads the tablet honoring the first settler to be interred in the sanctuary of a place of worship in 1697. Barnes Hill settlement is presently located on the estate of William Barnes. The church in St. Georges churchyard is one of the oldest on the island, and the cemetery is reputed to be one of Antigua's most eerie places. Background of St. George's The Hon. Martin Byam's mill was located close to the location of St. George's church, according to John Lufman's 1777 map, though the name of the mill is not given.

Legacy of British Slave-Ownership: 264 slaves; given £4,128 14s 6d. Byam did not receive the prize, whereas William Shand did.

In his testament dated November 20, 1734, Edward Byam of Antigua stated that Benjamin Asty and his family will be given usage of his little island, "Needs Must," along with the home. My wife will receive £500 from my stock in England if I am completely destroyed in the current battle.

General Bart allegedly saw an apparition in 1777 while eating at a party at "Pensive Hall," the grand house on Martin Byam's estate that is now owned by Mister Shands of Liverpool, England. The apparition reportedly told General Bart that he would receive the order "Thou shalt die and not live" before twelve moons had waxed and waned. He described the situation to the group and showed his unwavering faith in it. His friends took him to the Big House on Weir's estate (now Francis Byam Ottly, Esqresidence) .'s and tried to cheer him up with merry gatherings, but to no use. After ultimately leaving for England, he passed away during his voyage, exactly one year after he first saw the apparition.

John Duer Cranstoun oversaw the estates at Union Plantation, Cooke's, and Fitches' Creek in the late 1800s. Potter's, Cochran's, and Thomas' were eventually owned by the Cranstoun family. The Abbott family is briefly described in an excerpt from a letter to his son in Canada on December 20, 1918, written by Langford Sally Cranstoun (the son of John Duer Cranstoun). "Fred (Robert Alfred Abbott), Overseer with Dyett at Fitches Creek, turned the corner too short and got his two-wheeler turned over on him; he had to be taken to the hospital the same day with his sister (blood poisoning); they both went at the same time as their mother was sick with the flu, but they are all slightly improving."

Francis Shand, a West India merchant from Woolton Wood in Liverpool, had sizable estates in Antigua in 1837. He wed Lydia Byam of Cedar Hill at St. George's in 1837. Fitches' Creek, which has 517 acres, is listed in the Antigua Almanac of 1851 as being owned by Misters W. & F. Shand.

Mr. H. Armstrong served as the manager in 1837. "One of the biggest on the island, with a total area of 500 acres, of which 300 are used for farming. There are 260 residents and employees on the property. This property betrays anything less than a fear of impending ruin. It more closely resembles the appearance of a death-to-life transition. He has plans for a new hamlet (as the collection of negro huts is known) and has already chosen the site and started to construct it, in addition to his enhanced sugar and boiling business (new and built after a concept of Mr. H. Armstrong's own devising — brick on a very enormous scale). The homes will be built of stone rather than mud and sticks, be larger than the ones that are now in use, and have a beautifully constructed roof. They are to be built on an elevated location, ranged at regular intervals around three sides of a larger square, instead of being packed together in one area as has typically been the case. In the center of the square, a building for a chapel and schoolhouse is to be constructed. There must be a garden at every home. Making sure that the interests of the people continue to exist on his estate has now become in the planter's best interests.

1852: "Edward Byams patent refers to Martin Byam's or Fitche's Creek property, then owned by Messrs. W & F Shand, and currently owned by Hon. Arthur Shand Esq. Cinnamon Island would be the 2-acre island.

Before getting married, Francis Shand (1800–1868) controlled a number of leases on nearby plantations. He was an absentee West Indian businessman and ship owner from Liverpool. He rose to become one of Antigua's largest landowners through his marriage to Lydia Byam (1837). Also, he had played a significant role in the negotiations for English emancipation arrangements. A 517-acre plantation at Martin's Byam or Fitche's Creek in St. George's Parish, a 230-acre estate at Mount Lucye in St. George's, a 128-acre plantation at Cedar Valley in St. John's Parish, the 90-acre Blizard estate, and various other estates owned or leased by Francis Shand were listed among their properties in the 1852 census. The union gave birth to 13 children, including Charles Arthur Shand, who would become their heir. Fitche's Creek was the lone remaining property by the middle of the 1980s. Many well-off families, including the Byams, Shands, and Codringtons, were nevertheless able to survive, despite the Shands' struggles with outdated sugar machinery that caused them to fall further into decay and debt. Even after DuBuisson and Moody Stuart, the company that would come to dominate the sugar industry in the twentieth century, arrived in the 1890s, some families continued to prosper; the Shands did not. Fitche's Creek estate, which was a portion of William Byam's original land grant and had been in the family's hands since the mid-17th century, was the only piece of real estate still owned by the family by the mid-1890s. The future George V was then entertained by the family in the 1880s when Charles Arthur was a young married man and invited to participate in duck shooting when visiting Antigua as a midshipman. Years later, while on a trip to Antigua as a minister for the federation, Phyllis requested to be taken to Fitche's Creek. However, when she arrived, all that was left of the old estate house was a "diminishing pile of grey stones lying in the grass," where a young boy had been practicing using his thumb and forefinger to hypnotize visitors into yawning. Phyllis Shand Allfrey (born in Dominica in 1908; died there in 1986) wrote a book titled Dominica, East Haunt of the Caribs. In the chapter titled "Ghosts in a Plantation Home," Phillis provides a fantastic tale of the last of the Byam/Shands in Antigua.

The lands were acquired by Moody Stuart and DuBuisson. Francis Byam Berkeley Shand, Phyllis's father (born in 1879), and his brother Kenrick were the last Byam Shands to grow up on the family's Antiguan estate. Charles Arthur, their father, was appointed to the position of magistrate at Nevis, where he passed very quickly. The 1852 Census revealed that Francis Shand owned or leased a variety of other properties in addition to Martin's Byam or Fitches Creek (517 acres), Mt. Lucye (230 acres), Cedar Valley (128 acres), and Blizard's (90 acres) as well as other substantial holdings. Its size in 1921 was 531 acres.

"Charles Arthur Shand of Fitches Creek" appeared in 1895.

April 1938 and Registration Book Book 0 Folio 14 of the Antigua and Barbuda Syndicate Estates Limited (Vesting) Act and the Lands of Antigua and Barbuda Sugar Factory, Ltd. As stated in Certificate of Title No.31, the entire land tract comprising Gunthorpes and Fitche's Creek Estates is roughly 103.373 acres. "St. George's pasture was the name of the area to the east of the church. The grass was used for many moonlight picnics and was known as a lover's road. Before it was turned into a housing complex, the entire area alongside the dirt road and the mangroves was a fantastic site to go crabbing with flambeau and crocus sac.

Three DuBuissons (James Memoth DuBuisson, Mrs. Edith Manus DuBuisson, and William Herman DuBuisson), Alexander Moody-Stuart, and Judith Gwendolyn Moody-Stuart received 18,000 shares of the Antigua Sugar Estates at a price of £1 apiece in 1940. When George Moody-Stuart was offered shares but turned them down, it represented the ultimate transition to the next generation (Antigua Syndicate Estates minutes, 4 January 1940; 1 May 1940). The "Gunthorpe's" estates, including Cassada Gardens, Paynter's, Tomlinson, Fitches' Creek, Donovan's, Gunthorpe'se, North Sound, Cedar Valley, Galley Bay, and Five Islands, would be under the authority of the new corporation.

W.C. Wynter served as the Syndicate Manager in 1939, while D.W. Bailey served as the Overseer. N.S. Slack of North Sound, Fitches' Creek, Cassada Gardens, Langford's, and Jolly Hill served as the superintendent for the Syndicate Estates Group C in 1945. The Superintendents, Managers, and Overseers for Syndicate were frequently relocated; in 1952, P.H. Yearwood was transferred from Gilbert's to Fitches' Creek; Rupert Grant and Archibald Butler served as the Overseers; and F.H. Francis was transferred as the Manager from Fitches' Creek to Betty's Hope. Group C consisted of North Sound, Fitches' Creek, Cassada Gardens, Jolly Hill, and Creek Side in 1955, totaling 726.8 acres. There were 13 Syndicate Estates at this time. The previous manager, D.W. Bailey, passed away in 1949, and Mr. W. Mandeville of North Sound relocated to Fitches Creek. The Superintendents, Managers, and Overseers frequently changed locations within the Syndicate Estates, and in 1952 P.H. Yearwood relocated from Gilbert's to Fitches' Creek while Rupert Grant and Archibald Butler served as the Overseers. Fitches' Creek was joined with North Sound (#66), Cassada Gardens, Jolly Hill, and Creek Side in Group C, which made up a total of 726.8 acres, out of the three Groups, A, B, and C, that made up The Syndicate Estates. B.P. Slack was the Superintendent in 1952.

Fitche's Creek and Cane Returns for the 1941 Crop from Antigua Sugar Plant, Ltd. Estimated tons: 6398 tons of cane were delivered at a rate of 21.21 tons per acre on a 6740-acre estate with 40 acres of farmland.

1943: On August 1, Gunthorpes Estates, Ltd. underwent a reorganization (see #64 Gunthorpe's) and became a "new" business known as Antigua Syndicate Estates, Ltd. Cassandra Garden, Cedar Valley, Fitche's Creek, and North Sound were the estates of the original corporation, and they were purchased for a total of 30,700 pounds, while Delaps was acquired for 7,734 pounds.

1952: The Fitche's Creek house was put up for sale by the Syndicate at a reasonable cost for the movable parts. In other words, it was in such bad form that it couldn't be fixed and was therefore sold for scrap.

R.S. Paton served as the Syndicate Estates' manager in 1956.

1958: 18.76 acres near Fitches Creek, which would subsequently become a house complex, were sold to Charlesworth and Maude Ross. Charlesworth Ross was born in 1918 in Antigua. From 1949 until 1956, he served as Montserrat's commissioner. He also served as British Colonial Secretary for the Leeward Islands and worked as a civil servant his entire life. He was highly interested in the megaliths on Greencastle Hill and authored a book called "From an Antiguan's Notebook" on them. The Syndicate Estates, Ltd. sold Charlesworth and Maude Ross 18.76 acres in Fitche's Creek in 1958.

The Antigua and Barbuda Syndicate Estates, Ltd (Vesting) Act and the Lands of Antigua and Barbuda Sugar Factory, Limited were both passed on December 30, 1969. 1. The entire 103.373-acre plot of property that is a component of the Gunthorpe and Fitche Creek Estates, as described in the Certificate of Title No. 31/1936, dated August 7, 1936, and registered in Register Book N Folio 31.

Gravenor’s 
A modest plantation with 53 slaves and 83 acres as of 1829. Although it can be seen from Thibou's, which is to its west, the mill is in outstanding condition and was quite challenging to get because of undergrowth. In what is now known as Jabberwock beach, the height of the land is sufficient to provide views of the ocean. In October 2004, Jane Seagull & David Sullivan finally succeeded after three failed tries and five hours of labor. They took the pictures that are attached. The only unique aspect of the stunning stonework was a sizable rectangular floor pit that was not seen at any other mill sites. It's interesting to note that Barbuda has a boat landing called Gravenor's Landing that is close to Spanish Point.

In 1671, planter John Heely of Antigua, an ex-landlord of Richard Veele, sold 5 acres at New North Sound to Thomas Gravenor. Thomas Gravenor Gent requests permission to use a rock called Exchange, located north of Antigua, as building stone for the construction of a residence.

Thomas Gainsborough's (1727-1788) picture The Gravenor Family (John and Ann with daughters) is currently on display at Yale Center for British Art (USEVM). The artwork reads, "Petition of Thomas Gravenor for gift of a rock called 'Exchange' for establishing a dwelling place. Rec. 30 January 1756," Oliver Volume II, page 34. It is also believed that stone from the North Shore islands was quarried at the same time and transported back to St. John's to build the Courthouse in St. John's (designed by architect Peter Hamilton). Today, it is obvious that stone has been removed when looking at Exchange Island.

"Antiguan spinster Anna Gravenor Will 1789. to be buried in my late father Thos. Gravenor, Esqburial .'s plot on his plantation. The granddaughter and co-remainder for Gravenor's estate according to her grandfather's testament, Ann Gravenor Buckley, was wed to John Laviscount. Manning & Anderdon's John Laviscount Anderdon (1792–1874) was a partner in the company. Baptized in 1769, Jane Richardson Buckley had one-fourth of Gravenor's. The Indenture of 1812 "conveys to Wlm Ew King and John Lavicount their undivided 4th part of all that plantation known as "Gravenor" in the Division of Popeshead, containing 100 acres, all in cane except for a small amount of pasture lying between the estates of Mr. Nibbs and Mr. Jarvis which encircle the said plantation all around." When the first inhabitants in Antigua arrived in 1632, the name of the first Ledeatt appears. In documents from forty years later, it is said that Antiguan planter Thomas Lyddiat "leased 12 acres of property to John Cable." The Ledeatt family name was still used in Antigua up until the middle of the 1940s, and tomb markers honoring this family may still be found there.

Dr. John Freeland, a government medical officer, estimated that there were 53 lepers living in Antigua in August 1890, 12 of whom were men and 19 of whom were women. Particularly, the death of Father Damien de Veuster, a missionary priest, at a leper asylum in Hawaii in 1889, had sparked a worldwide fear over leprosy. This is also the time that Freda Cassins' "With Quiet Tread" was penned. Dr. John Freeland's article "Notes on Leprosy as Seen in Antigua, West Indies" was published in the British Medical Journal on October 5, 1889. repercussions of British slavery.

The Gravenor's of 83 acres, according to the Antigua Almanac, belonged to John Freeland's heirs in 1851.

Giles Blizzard’s 
The tombstone and the mill, which are both located in one house's garden, are both in outstanding condition but are being encroached upon by the expanding village of New Winthorpes. To equip a town with a gravity-fed cistern that is no longer in use, the upper portion of the mill was shut off. It is possible to remove the mill equipment for scrap iron because it is located immediately outside the mill to the west. Janice Fredrick, who passionately guards it, informed us that the government has twice had intentions to turn the hilltop area into a park, but that these plans have not yet come to pass. The encroachment of the village has removed all remaining evidence of this estate. "Giles Blizzard est Anno Domini 1778," is written on an oval inscription above the mill's door with a rope pattern border. "At the request of Dr. Henry Stodden we have surveyed the plantation belonging to Capt. Giles Blizard, and now in the ownership of his children, of 155 acres," said one of the early settlers.

"Giles Blizzard, of HMS 'Dreadnought' 12 December 1688,".

Giles Blizard, an affluent elderly man who flaunted his wealth, was reputed to maintain a fine collection of dubloons and joes (gold coins) on hand. His son Geoffrey, who is black, was one of the two slaves that killed him; they were captured and hanged for their crimes. His children received 155 acres from him. "Around 70 years ago, a man by the name of Giles Blizard held a property in Pope's Head, Antigua. Now, the property has been combined with another and is owned by the Honorable Bertie E. Jarvis. In the past, Giles Blizard was a real planter. A proud and high-born beauty who by some weird coincidence has been mixed with the ordinary herd, he lived in an old, spacious mansion on his estate where richness and meanness were sharply contrasted. There, expensive salvers and silver flagons shone among the plain English pottery. Its dirty walls and darkish roof of the flats, whose protruding beams provided only protection to numerous hordes of insects, were mocked by the shiny surface of the mahogany furniture. The elderly guy, who was surrounded by many slaves, exercised power like a prince and gave no misgivings about the Saxon Thane or more pompous feudal baron. Like the majority of Antiguan planters, he was extremely hospitable; his doors were always open, and every visitor was guaranteed a warm welcome. However, everything in his home was run on a scale of heavy munificence; his table groan under the weight of its various viands; but there was no order, no delicacy observed in the arrangement of them. Such was the domestic setup of the old Antiguan houses. A outsider would have been startled to have fine wines of the finest vintage given to him by a barefoot butler, or his every move attended to by a horde of half-naked slaves. Giles Blizard was rumored to be incredibly wealthy and to possess a fine collection of hard currency, which during those gilded times typically took the form of doubloons and joes (a gold coin with a value of roughly 3l.4s. sterling). A gold coin called a "joe" cost around 36 pence sterling. He enjoyed bragging about how much wealth this world had to offer, which aroused the rapine of two of his slaves, inspiring them to murder him in order to take possession of his wealth. Long sought for, a convenient time to carry out this deed was finally realized. The elderly guy settled down on a sofa at the end of a dismal day in the last month of the year to get ready for his evening nap. He was joined only by a black child by the name of Diamond. The apartment residents occasionally listened during the storm's breaks because they thought they could hear approaching footsteps, but the wind shook the shoddy shutters with such force that it drowned out all sounds, leading them to believe that it was just their imaginations or the hollow moaning of the blast. The planter adjusted his head once again and dozed off while the painted hands of an old clock indicated the hour of midnight. The two slaves, who were planning to murder their master and his young attendant, had been keeping an eye on their movements through a crack in the shutter. When they realized that their master was sleeping because of his unaltered position and deep breathing, they quietly removed the shutter and entered the apartment while brandishing a blunderbuss. They demanded the location of the man's cash while placing their hands on his shoulders and raising the dangerous weapon above his head. The murderers were not to be deterred from their fell purpose; the finger was pressed upon the fatal trigger, and the deed was done; the soul of Giles Blizard won its way to the vast shores of eternity, and the sofa where he laid him down in full confidence of safety was covered with his brains, blood, and severed hairs. In vain their victim prayed for mercy; in vain he requested the blessing of one short hour to collect his scattered thoughts. As horrifying as it is for humanity to learn, one of the murderers was the old man's natural son, who believed he was not the murderer, and who was the one who encouraged this dreadful act. Geoffrey (the name of Mr. Blizard's colored son) told the black man to do it right away and make sure of it, or else he would do it himself. After committing this horrifying crime, the murderers set the blunderbuss on a table next to their victim, along with a glass of brandy and some water. If the murderers were ever caught, it would be assumed that they had committed an act of self-destruction, but murder is a crime "that's rank, it smells to heaven," and most of the time, the killer is found. The youngster, who had been sound asleep when the men entered the room, was roused by the disturbance, but upon seeing the blunderbuss and hearing the conversation that took place between his master and his killers, he grew fearful and pretended to be asleep in order to protect himself. As morning came, he hurried to recount the events, and in this way, the criminals were prosecuted. They were led before a court and given the day after that to die by being beheaded. The offenders were brought down to a location called Gallows Bay, where such scenes were frequently staged, and after being blindfolded, they were tied to the upright post of the gallows and had their right hands first amputated before having their heads cut off. Their bodies were dragged down to the water's edge and burned there in a lime kiln, while the heads were first soaked in pitch and then put upon spikes with the hands nailed under them. Although beheading used to be a common method of execution in the past, I believe this was the last time decapitation was used in Antigua. By Mrs. Lanahan, Antigua & the Antiguans. Jarvis Family Papers, 1790–1884, University of Michigan's William L. Clements Library. When New Winthrope's was moved to the north side of the sugar mill, a gravestone that had been on the hillside was moved. It is currently in someone's backyard. I have learned that this person is Janice Fredrick (née Mascal), and she claimed that when the village of New Winthorpes was founded, the gravestone (MI) was placed close to the mill. On Mama Marcy's (dec.) property across from the Hampson's home, Rachel Blizard's original grave from 1707 was close to the water catchment. The MI faces straight east, so Janice keeps a piece of plywood in front of it to shield it from the elements. "Here lyeth interred the Corpse of Rachel Blizzard who was born the 27th day of September, 1707," is written on it. She was the pride of humanity and the care of her mother, who by an unfortunate turn of events died in her prime. Her parents erected this tomb as a memorial to their memory. "John Jarvis Esq. of Mount Jarvis is the owner of the Giles Blizard."

The estate had 830 acres in 1821 and 513 acres in 1921.

1851: Bertie E. Jarvis is listed as the owner of Blizard's, Giles, in the Antigua Almanac for that year. 1943 Land was sold to the Government of the Leeward Islands to make "Blizard's" Village settling easier (New Winthorpes). The Cedar Valley estate, formerly known as Giles Blizard's, sold 5,388 acres for a sum of £80.16s.5d. recorded in the Antigua Syndicate Estate, Ltd. minutes. The 1942 lease agreement between the Government of Antigua and the US Air Base resulted in the relocation of the community of Winthorpes' from its original location, which is now the runway for the V.C. Bird International Airport.

Gunthorpe’s 
Nothing remains on this property to suggest the location of the old estate buildings or home. But, Mackie (Mackey) Hill would have been the ideal location because it has a brick cistern on the property and looks out over the nearby flat countryside. This subsequently developed into the location of one of the island's biggest factories, the Antigua Sugar Plant.

500 acres near New North Sound, historically known as Bucks Plantation, according to 1667. In 1667, John Gunthorpe visited Philip Warner. Purchased from Maj. Mussenden by John Gunthrop.

1678: "In 1678, John Gunthrop (d. 1693) bought 500 acres at North Sound." The newborn Charles Henderson's mother, Margaret Henderson, asserted in 1687 that Charles Henderson was the legal owner of Buck's Plantation in New North Sound Division, Antigua because he was the late Archibald Henderson's nephew (who had been exiled from the island in 1674). She stated that John Gunthorpe was the "...son-in-law of that Egregious Traytor John Cooke, Solicitor General to the pretended court of Justice against King Charles the Martyr...," in her responses to the Lord Justices.

Donovan's and Gunthorpe's estates switched to steam in the middle of the nineteenth century. The majority of this is flat, agricultural ground that was simple to farm. Although the sugar plant is frequently referred to as Gunthorpe's, this estate, which is one of Antigua's most significant locations, has been eclipsed by the development and operation of the Antigua Sugar Factory. Estates including Painter's, Fitche's Creek, Weir's, and North Sound were close by.

There were 71 plants producing muscovado sugar in Antigua in 1897 when a West Indian Royal Commission visited the island. 17 windmills and 54 steam mills were among them. At the time, sugar beet was overtaking the UK market, and it was understood that for the business to continue, a significant change in manufacturing practices was required. The Rev. H.Y. Shepherd, the Rector of St. John's, and the Rev. A. Shankland, the Rector of St. George's, performed an impressive religious ceremony at the portal of the buildings to start the proceedings of the Antigua Sugar Factory opening ceremony, which took place at four o'clock in the afternoon on December 19, 1904. The flywheel was then turned by Lady Knollys, who gave the engine the name "DuBuisson". to the applause of those in attendance. After that, Mrs. Watts, Dr. Francis Watts' wife, started putting the first canes into the mill. In the words of the Antigua Standard, "the engines continued to exert themselves in a manner most evocative of the genius of man battling with his Creator in the direction of energy as powerful as useful, but manageable human will." the machinery ran extremely smoothly. The crowd then looked over the attractively decorated structures. The governor's health was a suggestion made by Mr. Thomas D. Foote, to which Sir Courtenay Knollys answered.

1905–1954: Antigua Sugar Plant, Ltd. The history of the Antigua Sugar Factory (ASF) and Antigua Syndicate Estates, Ltd. (ASE), which were wholly interdependent and merged, has never been entirely understood by the average person. It should be highlighted that all of the participants who had shares in ASE also served on the board of Henckell Du Buisson & Co. in London, the firm that registered and reported to ASF. I'll make an effort to rebuild from the ASF and ASE minutes and a brief history by George Moody-Stuart. “ In 1980, George Moody-Stuart CBE (1851–1940) made his first trip to Antigua (as well as St. Kitts). That was unusual for a London-based merchant at the time, but he used to go there every year for a few weeks between the New Year and Easter, even though he never resided there. He was in charge of establishing the central factories in Antigua (ASF) in 1904 and St. Kitts (1911), which were both controlled by Henckell DuBuisson & Co. and owned by London-based businesses. (I was unable to find the names of these London-based businesses.) He served as these companies' chairman until 1937, when his eldest son Mark took over. Alexander, his youngest son, traveled to Antigua in 1924 in an effort to improve the agricultural conditions in more of the cane-growing regions. He established Antigua Syndicate Estates (ASE), which he ran until 1961, the year he retired and ASE was bought out by ASF. In 1960, he was knighted. Between 1961 through 1966, Sir Alec's eldest son George served as general manager of ASF, by which time it was obvious that sugar production in Antigua was no longer viable economically. After buying ASF, which also included ASE, the government fought for a while before realizing that closing was the only option.

1939: On January 4, the Gunthorpes Sugar Estates Ltd. held its inaugural meeting.

To three DuBuissons (James Memoth DuBuisson, Mrs. Edith Manus DuBuisson, and William Herman DuBuisson), Alexander Moody-Stuart, and Judith Gwendolyn Moody-Stuart, the Gunthorpe Sugar Estates had reissued 18,000 shares at £1 each in 1940. When George Moody-Stuart was offered shares but turned them down, it represented the ultimate transition to the next generation (Antigua Syndicate Estates minutes, 4 January 1940; 1 May 1940). The "Gunthorpes" properties, including Cassada Gardens, Painter's, Tomlinson, Fitche's Creek, Donovan's, Gunthorpe's, North Sound, Cedar Valley, Galley Bay, and Five Islands, would be under the jurisdiction of the new corporation. The Antigua Sugar Plant was also created in this year. Antigua Gunthorope's Estates, Ltd. underwent a restructuring in August 1943 and changed its name to Antigua Syndicate Estates, Ltd.

Robert Bryson had retired and returned to England, but he remained a partner and shareholder. The factory asked R.S.D. Goodwin and Edward Scott-Johnson, directors of George W. Bennett-Bryson, to become directors of the Gunthorpes Estates, Ltd. (Antigua Syndicate Estates minutes, 2 April 1943). In August, Goodwin was appointed company chair (earning £500 annually in addition to his Bryson pay; Moody-Stuart made £1,000 annually as general manager). On August 1, 1943, the reorganization agreement was signed. The original estates, Tomlinson, and the tractor workshop were "bought" by the "new" company, now known as Antigua Syndicate Estates, Ltd., over the course of the following year from Gunthorpes Sugar Estates, Ltd. The "new" company then went on to purchase nearly every remaining producing estate, including Delaps, the Bennett-Bryson estates, the jointly owned Bennett-Bryson/R.S.D. Goodwin estates, the Cod It acquired the Dew's holdings in 1946. Bennett-Bryson received an invitation to serve as directors of the Gunthorpe's Estates, Ltd. Robert Bryson, who had retired and moved back to England, remained a partner and stakeholder (Antigua Sugar Estates minutes, 2 April 1943).

Cassandra Garden, Cedar Valley, Fitche's Creek, and North Sound, the original company's holdings, were purchased for £30,700 each, while Delap's was acquired for £7,734. The Bennet-Bryson estates were Sanderson's, Long Lane / Lavington's /Ffry's, Burke's/La Roche/WIllis Freeman's, Jolly Hill (Jolly Hill , Blubber Valley, Ffry's, Montero's, Yorke's and the Cove), Hawes and Mercer's Creek, Cochrane's and Thomas', and were bought for £39,000, and the Bennett-Bryson/R.S.D. Goodwin estates (owned 2/3 by Bennett-Bryson and 1/3 by Goodwin) were Morris Looby's , Bodkin's, Parry's and Diamond, all bought for £7,400. Gilbert's, Pares/ Cochran's, and Comfort Hall/Creek Side were the Dews estates. In the 1943 deals, the Moody-Stuarts kept Galley Bay and Five Islands. In addition, the majority of Langford's and Weir's were leased (from the government in 1945 – after the Land Settlement Board removed the tenants). 1947 negotiations with Mary Camacho for Carlisle and a portion of Barnes Hill failed but were ultimately resolved.

1955: All working livestock (mules, horses, and cattle) were removed from the estates, and only those animals were kept that would help the local meat supply. They were very expensive due to the price of food, water, and labor. The use of motorcycle transport by the managers and overseers on the estates was allowed by the Board in 1958, and it was a success. They were less expensive and labor-intensive than using horses, although they frequently had issues in particularly wet weather.

1957 saw the purchase of Gaynor's.

Weir's is acquired in 1958.

Sir Alexander Moody-Stuart resigned from his position managing the company's estates in 1960 owing to illness, but he consented to join the advisory board. The Syndicate Estates held various positions of power. In addition to repairing and constructing homes on the estates for their managers and overseers, they also built and successfully bid on a house for George W. Bennett Bryson & Co. at Hodges Bay for $31,441 in 1956. They imported the Gyrotiller in 1928, which was a massive piece of machinery (the earth shook when it worked); they raised milch and beef cattle; they raised corn for feed and to supply the corn meal factory; they planted cotton as well as sugar cane; they exported mules and horses to a Mr. Lignieres; and they owned and leased most of the heavy equipment such as trucks and tractors and repaired them. The Corporation (ASF) acquired ASE in 1959 "as shareholders are aware, on the basis of 2 shares in ASF for 3 in ASE. Although it will take some time before the work of the two Companies can be combined, your Board is satisfied that this was a smart decision and will ultimately be in the Company's best interests. The 40th Annual Report to August 31, 1959 (ASF). Money rarely changed hands; instead, the value was swapped for a portion of the company's shares.

Gunthorpe's had 690 acres and 280 slaves in 1829. 633 acres in 1921. Every estate had a neighboring burial site where the proprietors and their relatives were interred; some of those tombstones are still discernible in the surrounding vegetation today. Nearby, there was frequently a slave cemetery where the spider lily plant served as a marker for the dead. The words "To the Memory of/Thomas B. Freeman/Who was Born Anno Domini 1797 and /departed This Life September 13th 1827/Aged 30 years - 8 lines follow" were written on a little ledger at Gunthorpe's. Moreover, the next 8 lines are in honor of Henry Freeman, who passed away on December 15, 1837. Another grave marker with the inscription "Sacred to the memory of George Vurt who deceased on the 5th September 1881..." aged 33 years. "There were two tombstones forming part of the foundation at the location of one of the houses on the factory housing complex, the one known as the "Stamer's" house. Upon going through, we used to get the chills as kids. Yet I can't recall the names on the grave markers. Joslyn Evelyn, née Lake.

Slavery was eventually outlawed in the British Caribbean, Mauritius, and the Cape in 1833 by an act of Parliament. While the slave trade was outlawed in 1807, it took another 26 years for the enslaved to be freed. It was believed that plantation owners should get compensation for their slaves' upcoming freedom, which led to the law of 1833. Twenty million pounds, a significant sum in those days, were split among all slave owners. Gunthorpe, Margaret Not an Applicant 1871 £3922 3s 0d Antigua 350 (Gunthorpe's; St. George's) (297 enslaved) 1851: The Antigua Almanac lists 690 acres as belonging to W. Gunthorpe's heirs. 1864–1892: Documents, Letters, and Designs, Gunthorpe (deceased).

1837: Francis Shand, a West India merchant from Woolton Wood in Liverpool, acquired substantial estates in Antigua. In St. George's, he wed Lydia Byam of Cedar Hill in 1837.

The West India Encumbered Estate Court sold Gunthorpe's Antigua estate to Francis Shand for £2,000 in 1858.

1897: The Antiguans were unsuccessful in their attempts to keep control over the process in the negotiations that followed the Norman Commission's suggestions to invest in Antiguan sugar production by constructing a central refinery to make grey crystals. A British corporation with financial resources and the support of the Colonial Government received the funding to develop the refinery. After a few years, Henckell DuBuisson & Co. of 5 Putney Lane, London, controlled the Legislative Council, owned the majority of the producing estates, and set the tone for social interactions. As a West Indian Sugar Merchant, Henckell DuBuisson incorporated as a private firm in 1920. My understanding is that Tate & Lyle later purchased their stakes. The Antigua Sugar Factory (ASF) was constructed in 1904 by the Glasgow company Mirrlees Watson & Co., under the supervision of George Moody-Stuart CBE, and the London company Henckell Du Buisson & Co., 5 Lawrence Pountney Hill, London EC4 (est.1840). A financial contribution of £15,000 for Gunthorpe's and £3,000 for Bendals was made by the Imperial Government.

The riots of March 9, 1918, in 1918. There is a stone plaque with the words "9th March, 1918" on the corner of Newgate and Popeshead Street. Monument honors the notorious riot that resulted in three fatalities and fifteen injuries. A disagreement erupted over the estate owner's way of paying for cane to be cut during the severe drought that year, which resulted in hunger and poverty. They preferred to pay by the ton rather than by the row. The workers could see how much they cut per row, but after they were placed onto carts and sent to the manufacturing yard to be weighed, there was no way for them to see what they were actually getting paid for. Cutters at Delaps refused to cut cane, so Charlie Martin called the first-ever workers' meeting at All Saints. Until fields were burned beforehand and cane fires were started in Villa, Gambles, and Palmer Jelly, cutters would not cut cane. When cane cutters attacked North Sound, martial law was declared on March 1, and George Weston and Willie Collins were charged with starting fires. When Governor Best and the Anglican Bishop attempted to reason with the angry mob, they were met with stones and broken bottles. The enraged crowd grew disorderly. After reading the Riot Act, Police Chief Colonel Edward Bell warned that if the mob would not disperse within an hour, shots would be fired. The police opened fire on the crowd when they didn't. 1918 saw the implementation of new laws. For every 5 tons or fraction thereof beyond 9 tons, an acre increases by 1/2d. On fields with an average of more than 14 tons per acre, a sliding scale for plant canes beyond the minimum rate must be fixed, increasing by 1/2d per line for every 5 tons or portion thereof above 14 tons. The minimum amount due on Saturday at noon The surplus rate is due on the following Saturday by noon upon presentation of the factory's certificate detailing the amount of field cut tons per acre for each individual cutter. Tiers will be paid by their respective tiers at a rate of 9(d) per day by the Cutters.

Gunthorpe's had 531 acres in 1921.

1926 saw a redesign of the Antigua Sugar Plant in order to create white crystal sugar, which sold for more money. The Antigua Syndicate Estates, Limited (Vesting) Act and the Lands of Antigua & Barbuda Sugar Factory, Limited were both passed in 1938. April 1938 and Folio 14 of Registration Book 0. As stated in Certificate of Title No.31, the entire parcel of land including Gunthorpe's and Fitche's Creek Estates is roughly 103.373 acres. The Antigua Trades and Labour Union was established in 1939, marking the beginning of the workers' real struggle for rights.

1939 saw the closure of the Bendal's Sugar Plant and the relocation of some equipment, including a 10-ton vacuum pan and pump. It was created at Gunthorpe's with the primary goal of producing 3,000 tons of sugar annually. The first crop yielded 1,634 tons of sugar, and the finished facility cost £45,359 in sterling. It reached 4,230 tons by 1907, and 7,336 tons by 1913, when adjustments were made to account for the rise. In 1904, Mr. L.I. Henzell OBE served as Chief Engineer, and by 1907, he was General Manager. The ASF office was run by Mr. G.A. Macandrew from 1904 until his retirement in 1920. ASF also received a number of employees from Bendal's Sugar Plant, including junior engineer James McIndoe Watson.

1940: On March 3, 1940, the Antigua Trade & Labour Union (AT&LU) was granted legal status. Wigley George, the president of the union, devoted the day to the original "Thirty-niners," who spearheaded the labor uprisings in the 1930s, in his speech. (In 1967, the Antigua Barbuda Workers Union, or ABWU, was established.)

Three DuBuissons (James Memoth DuBuisson, Mrs. Edith Manus DuBuisson, and William Herman DuBuisson), Alexander Moody-Stuart, and Judith Gwendolyn Moody-Stuart received 18,000 shares of the Antigua Sugar Estates at a price of £1 apiece in 1940. When George Moody-Stuart was offered shares but turned them down, it represented the ultimate transition to the next generation (Antigua Syndicate Estates minutes, 4 January 1940; 1 May 1940). The "Gunthorpe's" estates, including Cassada Garden, Paynter's, Tomlinson's, Fitche's Creek, Donovan's, Gunthorpe's, North Sound, Cedar Valley, Galley Bay, and Five Islands, would be under the authority of the new corporation.

The Cane Returns for 1941 Crop was released in 1941 by The Antigua Sugar Plant, Ltd. A total of 6,497 acres for estates under cultivation and 2,546 1/2 acres of peasant land on estates under cultivation resulted in 144,691 tons of cane being delivered. The 86 estates that are still producing cane and have delivered it to ASF are shown below, along with their individual tonnage and acreage records. The estates that are missing from the list are typically located in developing areas, such as Winthorpe's, which is now an airport, Barnes Hill, Crabb's & Carlisle's, etc., or those that belonged to Montpelier, which was still in operation. More cotton was being grown on a few of the estates, and livestock was being raised on others. The names are listed in the report's order. Cassada Gardens, Fitche's Creek, North Sound Delaps, Tudways, Belvidere, Cocoanut Hall, Weir's, Morris Looby's, Parry's & The Diamond, Mercer's Creek, Cochran's & Thomas, Sanderson, Willis Freeman's, Burke's, Long Lane & Ffrye's, Jolly Hill, Belle Vue, Comfort Hall, Pare's In 1944, Antigua Syndicate Estate, Ltd. replaced Gunthorpes Sugar Estates. For £3,500 and £125,000 in Syndicate shares, Codrington Estates was sold.

1951: Due to industrial action, 1,006 hours were wasted, and only 18,500 tons of sugar were produced. Memorandum of Understanding between the Antigua Trades & Labour Union and the Antigua Sugar Industry, dated January 1, 1951. Contact the following for more details. After more than 50 years of service, William Edwards, who helped build the Factory in 1904, retired at the end of the 1953 harvest. Numerous more people received recognition for their service spanning 30 and 25 years, respectively.

Diesel locomotives took the role of steam in 1955. The longest rail track density in the world was on the island of Antigua, which had 50.08 miles of rail running through it. One of them arrived at Point Wharf in St. John's Harbor, where bagged sugar was unloaded and stored in warehouses until it was time to be shipped (2016).

1958 was one of the worst years for the ASF because of the drought and labor unrest.

ASFactory workers went on strike in 1959, which resulted in the setting of fire to many of the estates' fields. The consequence was a slight pay boost.

1959: On the basis of two ASF shares for three ASE shares, ASE sold out to ASF and transferred all of its shares. At this time, the unions were becoming more powerful and backed the employees who were demanding more pay. Because of ongoing strikes and industrial closures, ASF had to import St. Lucian cane cutters to harvest the crop.

The Government of Antigua commissioned Prof. Simon Rottenberg to conduct the Rottenberg Inquiry Report in January 1960 to investigate the Antigua Sugar Industry. University of Chicago's Department of Economics Associate Professor. The venue for it was Princess Margaret School. David White, chief engineer, J. McFarlane, chief chemist, Sandy Wilson, chief accountant, Mr. Park, Peasant Development Officer (PDO), Jimmy Watson, manager, and ASF were all represented by George Moody-Stuart on behalf of HDB. The investigation's goals were to (a) review the financial situation of ASF and the industry, (b) look into the cost of sugar production at all stages, (c) find out why peasant cane growers are unhappy, (d) talk to all parties involved in the industry, and (e) present a report and recommendations to the government. It was concluded that the peasant community held many erroneous beliefs about how the business was operated, and it was advised that there be better ties between the PDO and the peasants to facilitate information sharing. It also demonstrated how dire the situation was for the sugar business.

The Mackenzie Investigation was carried out in 1961. Depending on the crop and non-crop seasons, ASF employed 477 – 831 people in that period and through 1957–1962.

1962 saw the formation of The Windward (Antigua) Sugar Factory Co. Ltd., which gave Maginley, Goodwin, Sir Codrington, and Ernest Dew each a part in the company.

1962 saw the importation of 102 cane cutters from St. Lucia. 1965: W.P. Cocking served as ASF's general manager, and George Moody-Stuart continued to serve as the organization's director. Due to the drought and labor issues, the crop only produced 14,040 tons of sugar this year.

1965: ASF agreed that the Antigua Government would pay $1,000,000BWI (£208.333, which would provide a cash investment that would protect jobs being the island's largest employer) for 308.333 ordinary shares. This certainly did not assist the situation, and on Thursday, July 21, ASF stated that the factory will be shut down and stop operations once the 1966 crop was harvested. On June 19, all field work came to an end.

1966: The government was to purchase the Antigua Sugar Plant Ltd. for $5,400,000.

The Antigua Workers Union was established in 1967, the year when England granted Antigua & Barbuda complete domestic autonomy. Gazette of February 23, 1967. Act on Unrepresented Estates, Chapter 85. The following list of unrepresented estates in the possession of the unrepresented estate administrator as of December 31, 1966, is published in accordance with section 32 of the Unrepresented Estates Act, Cap. 85.

1967 saw the government complete talks with the Sugar Plant (Henckell Du Buisson & Co. UK). The government of Antigua was acquiring the assets of the sugar industry for the country's citizens. Hugh Burrowes, Chairman of the CBE, Hon. Kenneth Gomez, Mr. Joseph Lawrence, Mr. Maurice Michael, Mr. George Sheppard, Mr. Anthony Shoul, Mr. Keithlyn Smith, and Mr. Percy Yearwood were named to a board of management for the industry. James McIndoe Watson acted as the receiver. Mr. Cheeseman was named general manager by the government in 1967.

On April 8, 1967, the bill to borrow $5,621,386.08 was authorized in order to buy the Antigua Sugar Plant Ltd.'s remaining properties, including the Antigua Syndicate Estates. The 1967 Loan Act. The loan was obtained from Royal Bank of Canada in exchange for the manager, Frank Dubeaut, turning over 13,000 acres of arable land. Twenty years later, in 1987, the former finance minister John St. Luce paid off the loan in full in front of the governor general, Sir Wilfred Jacobs, the prime minister, V.C. Bird, and the minister of agricultural lands, Hillroy Humphries. The Royal Bank mortgage on the land is removed by Act #32 of 1969.

The Workers Voice published an article titled "Board seek million-dollar loan for operation of Sugar Plant and Estates" on April 11, 1967. Mr. Cheeseman was chosen by the Board to be the Manager. The former employees were called back to work, and grinding operations might begin soon.

1968: V.C. Bird, the first premier of Antigua and Barbuda (1967), negotiated with Henckell du Buisson & Co. to buy the Sugar Plant for 6.5 million pounds. He pledged as security all of the estates that the government had lately purchased in order to obtain the loan from the bank. Regarding the sugar industry, the following Vesting Acts apply.

The Antigua and Barbuda Syndicate Estates, Ltd (Vesting) Act and the Lands of Antigua and Barbuda Sugar Factory, Limited were both passed on December 30, 1969.

All of that land area, which is roughly 103.373 acres, and which is a portion of the Gunthorpe and Fitche's Creek Estates, according to the Certificate of Title No. 31/1936, dated August 7, 1936, and registered in Register Book N. Folio 31.

All that land, measuring 3.7162 acres, that is a portion of the Gunthorpe Estate, as stated in the Certificate of Title No. 3411963, dated March 5, 1963, and recorded in Register Book D1 Folio 34.

The following are the estates listed under the Act, with the following exceptions:

 Fitzgeralds Creek,
 Bodkins, Morris Looby, 375 acres PDO $36,000
 The 32 acres of Cochran Tomlinson, H.A. $17,000
 Cochranes & Pares 8.2 - $4000 H.A. Claxton
 Creekside - privately owned 50 acres
 5 acres at Tudway's
 1.3 Carlisle Government Airport of Antigua
 Gaynor's - transportation Antigua Government PDO #11,000, 222.00 acres
 acreage at Table Hill Gordon - Antigua Government CHAPA $16,362
 Betty's Wish Antigua Government Chapa, 8.5 acres $7,200
 Title Certificate No. 10/1940 Acres 1800,01163 No. 11, 1940 acres 240.225 acres No. 22/1943 220.077 No. 24/1943 acres out of 262.281 No. 23/1943 acres 188.7223 acres No. 25/1943 676.72 No. 27/1943 acres, or 113.387 No. 26/1943 acres, and 539 (less an area)
 1.395 acres, No.28/1943 (less an area)
 2 roods and 30 poles in No. 29/1943 acres (less an area)
 Isaac Hill less area was sold to W.T. Camacho under No. 30/1943.
 Number of acres in 1943: 987.2139 Number of acres in 1944: 769.999 Number of acres in 1944: 1246.0682 Plus 86 acres of swamp
 Building No. 39/1944, 37 High Street No. 40/1944, 191.5109 acres No. 40/1945, 1315.035 acres No. 14/1947, 262.145 acres
 373.072 No.16/1947 acres No.17/1947 acres 305.2162 acres No. 18/1947 305.324 acres No. 19/1948 ———-
 Gunthorpe's and Fitche's Creek No. 9/1949 acres 129.06 No. 25/1949 acres 27.21 No. 13/1951 acres 918.321 No. 62/1951 acres 4.946 No. 64/1960 acres 123.619 No. 34/1963 acres 3.7162 No. 492/1965 acres 1 Part I 31/1963 acres 103.373
 59.5 acres, title #13/1938, no owner, Betty's Hope & Comfort Hall 14/1938 acres 5.26
 Number of title 76/1938 acres 28.9094
 Title No. 4/1939 Acres, Title No. 14/1939 Acres, Title No. 26/1939 Acres, Title No. 39/1939 Acres
 Title No. 44 (1939) acres 8.341 Title No. 45 (1939) acres 23.327
 Title #47/1939 —————–

In 1970, the sugar railway had 300 cane carts and 13 diesel locomotives.

1971: The newly elected PLM government shut down the sugar factory and estates, leaving 60% of the fertile land uncultivated. While the expensive copper tubing, fire blocks, tools, and spare parts were sold (some to St. Kitts), the machinery, equipment, and locomotives just vanished or were stolen. To construct fencing posts, the railroad lines were uprooted and hacked into pieces. Up until its closure in 1972, the factory was in operation. Since the sugar was of poorer quality, the company could no longer be sustained. Any surviving equipment has been disassembled and sold in the scrap iron market, with the majority of it having been sold to a plant in Barbados. The island's tourism industry was starting to flourish and eventually replaced other industries as the main source of income and employment for the locals.

It was proposed in 1979 to renovate and convert the abandoned factory at Gunthorpes so that it might produce 5000 tons of sugar per year for local use. This was seen to be a plausible assumption given the nearby Coca-Cola plant, Dunbar's jam business, and local consumption. It's almost comical that the factory has grown back to its original size from when it was constructed in 1940! construction of 1,400 acres of estate cane and provision of small farmers with machinery services to cultivate 1,750 acres. costing an estimated $10,523,900. A Barbados-based company helped with the machinery and restarting the plant.

In order for the new government to be able to buy the necessary equipment to reopen the business, Antigua Sugar Industrial Companies was established in 1979. By 1982, the factory had been restarted with the assistance of a Barbados company.

Antigua gained independence in 1981.

1985 saw the government of Antigua borrow $400,000EC from Swiss-American Bank, Ltd. to cultivate and harvest up to 120 acres of cotton for the 1985–1986 growing season. The facility produced sugar until 1988, when it was permanently shuttered.

1980: After eight years of operation, ASF ultimately closed its doors permanently in 1988. Over the years, the general managers included: 1907 When J.C. McMichael OBE, MSM, MI.MechE was elevated from Chief Engineer to General Manager until 1951, Leonard Henzell, the Chief Engineer, took over as General Manager until 1937 (ret). (dec.). James McIndoe Watson OBE, a junior engineer from 1940 to 1945 who served as chief engineer in 1952, rose to the position of general manager from 1954 to 1961. Manager of 1961–1966 George H. Moody–Stuart. While George H. Moody-Stuart was to stay Director, W.P. Cocking was appointed General Manager of ASF in January 1965 – 1967.

When the factory reopened in 1980, ————. There are numerous old images that depict several of the locomotive lines entering the yard as well as one stack (or chimney) at first, then two stacks as the business proceeded to produce more sugar. However, the majority of the original equipment was sold to industries in Barbados when they closed their doors in the 1970s, and the remainder was dismantled by scrap iron merchants, leaving little little to demonstrate the factory's interior's original layout. The asbestos used to insulate the majority of the pipes is flaking off in large chunks, making the area exceedingly dangerous to move around in. Given that our government was created from the Trade Unions that arose from the sugar days, this would have made a fantastic museum that would have provided the history of the island from the mid-1600s, when the sugar estates were being built, up to the present day. It is not just about the production of sugar; it is also about what happened to the island of Antigua after the Amerindian population was exterminated, how the island and its inhabitants developed into their current status, the influence of American bases, and current tourism. It's still possible to convert it into a museum because the original metal beams are still in tact and there are still pictures to tell the story. The Antigua & Barbuda Archives holds reams of ASF and ASE data, and the Museum of Antigua & Barbuda has a sizable collection of plans and drawings of ASF equipment, spare parts, and locomotives. The Sugar Factory complex served as a home for the workers there, with white management living on a short rise to the southwest and colored management, with the exception of Mr. CF Peters, on a flat tract directly west of the factory. While some of the mansions have completely vanished, several have been converted into individual residences. Cricket is still played on the vast playing field with clubhouse that was once there, and there was also a little store that was once owned by Mrs. L.I. Henzell and was open to the public at the gate entrance. The plant was well-known for its machine tool shop, which produced parts to keep the factory and trains operating as well as needed parts for cars, cake pans, and almost anything else in the private sector.

The Making of Sugar 

 Field workers cut down sugar canes, which were then transported by light railroad. 
 They were weighed before being loaded into a cane carrier and transported to the mill. They were trampled by a series of rollers there. 
 Another conveyor retrieved the begasse or crushed cane and sent it right to the furnace, where it was burned as fuel. 
 The contaminants were removed from the cane juice by adding lime to clarifying tanks where it was pumped. 
 The triple effect, a device for efficient evaporation made up of a number of closed pots in which the juice was heated to thicken it, was then used to extract the pure liquor through pipes. 
 The vapor from the juice in the first, when heated by steam, was made to boil the juice in the second, and that from the second the juice in the third, to which a vacuum pump was attached. This was accomplished by producing successively lower boiling points in the several vessels by reducing the air pressure in them.
 The juice, which was then referred to as syrup, was then transferred to the vacuum pan and cooked there until granulation started to occur at a low temperature. Using a "proof stick," the crystallization process was monitored. The massecuite was then transported to the centrifugals when the vacuum pan was "struck" or "tapped" at the bottom. They were sizable, mesh-sided drums that rotated 1,200 times each minute. This caused the molasses to be centrifuged out, leaving the sugar left, which was then placed in bags and prepared for transport.

"Looking back at the data, one can identify the dry years by counting the tons of sugar produced, with the worst years being 1924 through 1931, 1948, and 1954. Years at the Sugar Plant were spent by my grandmother Sutherland weighing cane for the Syndicate Estates. I've always believed that she was given that position at half her spouse's income after her husband passed away. Mrs. Sutherland used to commute daily by foot from The Wood to the factory to work by Piggot's village. Elizabeth Abbott. personal recollections. In 1940, shortly after the decision to shut down Bendal's and move all production to the Central Sugar Plant in Gunthorpes, I was born there. My mother, Mae Conacher, was a sixth generation Antiguan who had all worked in the sugar industry throughout history. My father, James (Jimmy) McIndoe Watson, was a Scot who arrived in Antigua in 1937 and married my mother in 1939. He received his mechanical engineering training at Mirrlees Watson & Co. in Glasgow. After dismantling the Bendals machinery, he transferred to ASF where he worked as a junior engineer until 1946 when he was transferred by Henckell Du Buisson & Co. in London to their factories in St. Lucia, Roseau, and Cul de Sac (who owned or managed the sugar factories in many of the islands). After the family moved back to Antigua in 1952, he joined ASF as a senior engineer. When Mr. MacMichael passed away, he succeeded Leonard Henzell as manager. When we initially moved in, Reg Jordan (at the time a Senior Engineer) was living in the small house below the Manager's home, which was the fifth house back from the main road. He was one of the first people to own a motor boat, which he kept in Parham, and the pier at that location is now known as Jordan Dock in his honor. It used to be prepared by Parham resident Victor Ferrence. The Lake home and the Cockburns, who were on the main road, were on the opposite side. These were regarded as the higher management staff homes and were all white, with the exception of Mr. Cecil Peters who resided to the west. Black families in lesser managerial positions, such the Corts and the Mathews, lived in staff houses on the other side of the main road. Only LC Wright, who performed all of the surveying work and resided atop Mackay Hill, did not actually reside on the site. We enjoyed strolling over to his gallery swing bench and visiting with him while sipping lemonade. We then relocated to the "new" Jordan house on the flat below that is currently owned by Dr. Lake before arriving at the manager's home at the top of the hill. Beautiful ancient wooden house with two bedroom wings off the main living, dining, and kitchen space with a gallery looking north, east, and south. Sadly, after the manufacturing closed, the structure was turned into a nightclub and burned to the ground. Two old cisterns and the remnants of the servants' quarters are all that is left. There were numerous live-in house servants on duty that day, along with additional factory employees who helped out in the gardens. When something broke or needed repair, factory workers who were all skilled in different crafts, including plumbers, electricians, bricklayers, etc., fixed it. Moreover, the machine tool shop could make about any machine part needed, even cake pans and car parts! When we were younger, there was a playground with swings and see-saws, and later there was a cricket field where we met the kids "over the road" to play cricket or rounders. The boys had bb-guns or catapults to shoot ground doves, which we cooked over an open fire, and they built club houses on some of the ponds where we also fished. When we were old enough to ride bikes, we went exploring through the cane field brakes until someone got a leech up their bum. Whether you attended the Convent School, Boys Grammar School, or Antigua Girl's High School, there was a factory van to transport you there and back, and if it broke down, you rode in the factory ambulance. Before Mr. Griffith Mathew laid down on the road in front of the vehicle to protest that their children deserved an education too and needed transportation, only the children of white management were transported at one point. We continued to be buddies from school and the cricket field and rode together after that. There was a thin line of segregation back then, but it was more of a social one when white communities accepted black families with doctors or lawyers as members. Even several Portuguese and Lebanese families at the time were unable to penetrate that social framework. We enjoyed crop season, and even now, as I pass the factory, I can still detect the peculiar crop scent, which was frequently referred to as "that stink" by people who had not been exposed to it and was quite distinct from the unpleasant smell at Weirs. Yet it might just be an invention of my mind! Our feet were black at the end of the day because the soot from the chimneys, which was seen flying in the air during crop time, blew directly over the property. The towels and linens, which were both invariably white back then, were also. There was no need for a watch back then because you could hear the factory horn (hooter), which blew at the conclusion of each shift, to tell the time of day. Every Saturday, we were allowed to bring a Captain's Cigarette can into the plant and dip it into one of the centrifugals of sticky molasses sugar. We also stole sugar cane to chew from the surrounding cane fields. After that, we would pause at the small store right outside the gates to get some "penny bread" to dip. Nothing improved after that, which served as our weekly treat. Agnes Meeker's Memoirs 2011-2015. Lawrence Gameson suggested to the Museum that a few of the locomotives that were rotting in the underbrush or being stored at different locations around the island be restored and used as a static display. In exchange for any loco bases, parts, or pieces that Lawrence transported back to the UK, where there is a lot of interest in rebuilding locomotives, the Minister of Tourism signed an Agreement allowing Lawrence to work on four distinct designs of locomotives at expense to him. With Lawrence traveling to Antigua during his free time, it took four years and £60,000 to rebuild Paul's Plymouth engine, the Hunslet "Bessie" from World War I, and The Marion. Before a home at Betty's Hope is constructed, all four can be seen in the Museum yard on Long Street in St. John's. A worker's cart and cane carts are just a couple of the strange objects that will be added to the collection. This was a 'last dance, final chance' kind of attempt to salvage some of the old sugar refinery machinery. When looking at the rotting remains of the former loco, it was difficult to imagine that it could ever be rebuilt. However, Lawrence ordered new steel components to be produced in the UK, supplied by Geest Lines, and then sprayed with paint made by the same business that coats the Firth of Forth Bridge in Scotland. This paint is expected to last for 20 years. Douglas Luery deserves a special thank you as well for not only saving many of the locomotives by keeping them in locations like Camp Blizard and Caribbean Relay, but also for researching the background of each locomotive and actively assisting Lawrence. Doug has also created two powerpoint presentations, one of which is highly technical and intended for historical purposes, while the other is intended for public viewing and accessible through the Museum of Antigua and Barbuda. The Antigua Sugar Factory, Ltd. and Antigua Syndicate Estates, Ltd. minutes, preserved at the Antigua & Barbuda Archives, are available for further information. a contract for the building of a sugar mill in Antigua and for related advancements." Printed by the Antigua Sugar Factory on October 26, 1903.

Hight Point (High) 
The estate house has been converted into apartments, and the mill has been demolished. Although it was constructed of stone and has endured the test of time, all of its wooden adornments, including the galleries, have vanished. The Lord Nelson Club, Tides, and Cecelia's Restaurant are all situated in Dutchman's Bay beneath High Point.

"We could spend the night at a little structure named Rock House that was constructed above the sea to the north of High Point. Everything was incredibly fantastic. — Rosemary (Goodwin) Magoris. Particularly on Sundays, many family gatherings and picnics took place at High Point with the use of Dutchman's Bay's neighboring beach. Margaret Conacher hosted a "mock champagne" (ginger ale and white wine) party for Mae Conacher's 21st birthday at High Point. The Conacher, Goodwin, Duncan, and McSevney families are the ones being discussed. The center window of the buff house's third story's three windows was bricked in when a young child crawled out of it and died after sliding off the roof. While it was before McDonald's, the window was never opened and remained permanently sealed. The High Point buff was bought by John St. Luce, who converted it into four apartments. Nowadays, it is still a house (2016).

Elizabeth Howell Gumbs, the widow of Dr. John Richardson, sells her property in St. George's Parish, in the Division of New North Sound, Antigua, to Samuel Martin, Thomas Jarvis, and William Hill for £617 in 1795. These people either rented High Point estate or were tenants.

Mr. Martin had 23 children between the years of 1690 and 1776. Josiah Martin, one of the Martins' sons, was elected governor of the Carolinas in the USA and emancipated his slaves. Scotchman Samuel Martin was born in Glen Cree in 1750. High Point, the name of Young Martin's estate in Antigua, was situated close to Parham Harbor's entrance in the northern section of the island between Winthrop's Bay and Dutchman's Bay. He gave his plantation to William, his second son from his second marriage, who was born in 1816. It was a little surprising to learn that Young Martin had two marriages and eleven children in light of Ms. Shaw's accusations that she detested women. He had six children with Grace Savage, the daughter of George Savage of the nearby "Savage Gardens" neighborhood in St. John's. After she passed away in 1810 at the age of 50, he remarried in 1812 to an unnamed widow with whom he had five more children. In England, where he had moved after leaving the collectorship, Mr. Martin passed away.

He passed away at Box, close to Bath, and it is believed that he shot himself in the head out of sadness brought on by his bankruptcy.

Around 1801–1812, Charles Curtis served as Samuel Martin's manager at High Point. Sam Martin served as Bertie Entwhistle's trustee at the time of his passing, and as a result of their relationship, Charles Curtis also oversaw the management of Entwhistle's estates, Golden Grove, Barnacle Point, and Jolly Hill. In 1822, Charles Curtis made his way back to London. A box of communication between Curtis and Samuel Martin recently came into the ownership of Curtis' relative Janet Richards, and it is currently being digitized.

Plantations at Nibb's, High Point, Barnes Hill, and Ronan's in 1824 ( High Point Plantation). The Nibb's and High Point Plantation were reconciled on March 7, 1824. To Geo. Savage Martin and Wlm Henry Martin, Francis Wrightwick. This Estate had 163 slaves and 212 acres in 1829.

William Shand, Esq. was introduced to W.H. and George Savage Martin in 1844. High Point Plantation transfer "In the West Indian Court of Encumbrances."

The 212-acre High Point is listed in the 1851 Antigua Almanac as belonging to Samuel Martin's heirs.

Mr. G.S. Martin owned Mount Pleasant in St. John's parish in 1852. The heirs of Samuel Martin possessed the 212 acres at High Point and the 131 acres at Nibb in St. George's Parish, while Sir. W. Martin owned the 605 acres at Green Castle and the 263 acres at Rigby in St. Mary's Parish.

William Kelso Martin, a resident of High Point and Sandersons, was born in 1816.

1835: George William Bennett, son of James Bennet, lived in Claremont Park, Leith (6 December 1835 – 11 November 1879). He left for Antigua to work as a merchant and sugar planter after serving an apprenticeship to a Liverpool merchant. For ten years, M.E.C. Elizabeth Burns and Jemima Peary were his first and second wives, respectively.

"Clyde McDonald rode his horse around the estate every day despite being blind (his wife Gippie, née Goodwin, was deaf). The horse was well-versed on the route. However, after they both passed away in the 1980s, their children came to handle their estates and to this day have been unable to find the bank where the US Navy money was deposited. a relative. Ian McDonald, a hotshot fighter pilot in World War I, offered to serve in Mesopotamia (Iraq). He thought he was going to "friendlies" when his jet was shot down, but instead wound up in enemy hands and vanished without a trace. The British were able to recover his goggles, gloves, and helmet, and they also recovered the propeller from his plane, which now rests over one of the side altars of the Anglican Church. Henry, E.T. Because my father worked for Mr. McDonald at Judges, Clyde and Gippie McDonald were permitted to reside at High Point for the entire period the estate was used as a US Naval Base. As a result, we frequently visited them. My mother spent time with them when she was younger, so they must have spent their entire marriage at High Point.

Cane Returns for the 1941 Crop, Antigua Sugar Factory, Ltd. High Point. Estimated tons, 54 acres of farmland on a 706-acre estate, and 415 tons of cane provided at a rate of 7.68 tons per acre.

1956: "During the holidays, we were there, and I well recall peering through the bedroom's sizable keyhole into my parents' bedchamber and saw a doll on the dressing table. This doll was to be my surprise Christmas present! On Christmas Eve, I recall listening to an old radio while seated on a daybed between Granny (Gyppie) and Grandpa (Clyde), hearing that Santa Claus was on his way and that he had already visited several nations. I recall my father (Roy McDonald) and Doug MacAndrew going into the cellar just before New Year's Eve to bolster up the floor so that it would be secure for the New Year's Eve celebration that Granny and Grandpa were planning to host. Dr. Winter, who had removed my tonsils a few weeks before, stated "I hope you are not eating those little girl!" when I handed him some peanuts during the celebration. Barbara Kirke nee McDonald's visits to her grandparents in High Point come to mind The High Point jetty was constructed straight down from the front of the house to the east when the US Navy took control of the High Point region. Although it is currently in poor condition, it is still utilized to unload sand from barges coming from Barbuda. Several people fish there since it used to be a popular spot to catch a few "puppy" sharks. As their primary landing location for the resort on Long Island, Jumby Bay has constructed a dock to the south of the jetty that is connected to a sizable parking lot. Mary Geo. Quin, who was born in the settlement of New Winthrops, is well recognized for writing poetry that vividly captures some of the island's historical events. "Number Eleven" chronicles the story of High Point during the 1942 US invasion of Antigua."

"Mary Geo. Quin's NUMBER ELEVEN. There was a cane field called Number Eleven on High Point Estate. Java, honey dew, Greenridge, 'leven-'leven, and forty seven all grew there. The softest, tastiest, and most juicy canes to ever sprout from the earth: The best estate for miles and miles around was High Point. Oh! Every year, during the growing season, in the rain or in the sweltering sun. We came to this exquisite field for an unparalleled feast. There, in good fun and to our hearts' content, we happily sucked candies till we had no more appetite for eating. The location of the property was so good that it was planned for when the Americans faced the decision of where to build. They received the least from the British government in exchange for their warships and lands for defensive measures. As we heard the news, we repeatedly cried out, "Why should they chose this land?" since we adored Number Eleven with all of our hearts. Will we get it all back when the lease expires and the Americans have left? we inquired with large, fat tears in our eyes and an unfeigned look of dismay. us poor! We had a limited understanding of all the upcoming changes. Not the events that would occur before the Americans withdrew: They converted Number Eleven into an airport, renaming it Coolidge Airport, and outfitted it with a hangar and a runway to handle their aviation transportation. If there's any consolation, the government of the country now owns Coolidge Airport, which has the distinctive and opulent name V.C. Bird International Airport! The period for which it was leased has not yet elapsed, but the Americans have long since left. Yet whatever name you give it—Coolidge, V.C. Bird International, or another—I still refer to it as Number Eleven because it is so significant in my eyes. Sometimes, just from remembering the canes that grew there, my stomach juices begin to flow with pleasant expectation."

Judge Blizzard’s (Blizard) 
There is still a mill, albeit it is a little unique from others in that it is taller and narrower. This mill is in good condition overall and still has some of the wood on the top visible. There is no proof that this estate switched to using steam. The remnants of the works and the buff house, which actually had a homeless person residing in the chambers below, are located behind the mill. The sole image discovered was of Judge's estate house following the devastation of the hurricanes in the 1950s, and it showed the mill in the distance with its roof intact. We received a copy of the photo via Mrs. Anthony Shoul, who was residing at the home at the time. The house was quickly reduced to rubble and overgrown with bushes because its renovation would have been too expensive at the time. Many china shards were discovered on the slope above after the ancient brick well's ruins across the street were swept away. Some of them were superb examples of the blue pottery that many colonists used during the day. An outstanding sample board illustrating and classifying the various kinds of china discovered in Antigua over the years is kept in the archives at Nelson's Dockyard and was assembled by Desmond Nicholson. Thibou's, Nibb's, and Giles Blizard were all just up the road to the north, east, and south, respectively.

Stephen Blizard now owns a 60-acre Green Island thanks to a patent from General Douglas in 1731. Letter from Stephen Blizard to Charles Tudway, Esq., written by Captain Patten at Wells, Somersetshire.

July 16, 1763: "The above is a copy of my last, and I have held it back for a while in the hope that we would have settled the Plantation Accounts by this point. Nevertheless, despite my repeated requests to Mr. Ash, who places sole responsibility on the Clerke, they are still not ready to lay before us. I am sending you one set of your son's wedding documents because this is the final Bristol ship. The other sett is still in the office, but I won't forget to send them to your son in London as soon as they are finished there. As of yet, Mr. Farley, Mr. Banister, and I have not met to discuss Mr. Ash's replacement.

Mrs. Jarvis resisted giving up Blizard's to Messrs. Turner in 1825. On October 13th, 1829, my sugars sold for 64 and 68 cents each. There were 219 slaves on the 422 acres.

1851: The Antigua Almanac lists Blizard's Judge as the owner of 422 acres that belonged to Stephen Blizard's heirs. comprised 422 acres that belonged to Judge Blizard's heirs in 1852.

1852: "Judge Blizard's" in the same parish in 1852 contained 422 acres and was owned by the heirs of Judge Blizard; "Will Blizard's," 30 acres, was owned by Messrs. W. & F Shand. Today, "Giles Blizard's" is owned by John Jarvis, Esq., of Mount Jarvis.

Judge's Report on Cane Returns for the 1941 Harvest from Antigua Sugar Factory, Ltd. Expected 872 tons, 54 acres of estate-owned farmland, and 725 tons of delivered cane at a rate of 13.42 tons per acre. according to Helen Abbott. "Sometime in 1942, my father started working at Judge's Estate for Mr. Clyde McDonald. We kept hens in Judge's expansive back yard, or so it seemed to me at the time, which was encircled by a gorgeous stone wall. In front of the home, a tower with a myrtle lime growing around it, and a lime kiln on the other side of the street. We built our own kites, rode horses, played board games like jacks and marbles, went for walks, and read. Never once were we idle. Troops from the adjacent US Base would frequently stop by for a home-cooked lunch and rave about my mother's fried sweet potatoes while carrying cigarettes and chocolates in their pockets."

In 1943, Syndicate Estates sold property to the Government of the Leeward Islands to make "Blizard's" community (which later became Winthorpe's) colonization easier. For £80.16s.5d, 5,388 acres from Cedar Valley (previously Giles Blizard's) were sold. The Judge's estate was last occupied by Anthony Shoul and his family before it was completely devastated by the 1950 hurricane. About 80 years ago, in the 1930s, the John Ferdinand Shoul family opened a store on the corner of Long and Market Street. Formerly known as "Kalil Shoul Branch Shop," also known as "Shoul's Branch Store." The name changed to "John F. Shoul's" after it was taken up by son John F. Shoul, Jr., who constructed the current structure in 1996 following Hurricane Luis in 1995.

Lightfoot’s/The Grove/Hart’s 
In this location, there is no longer a mill. Yet, there are still remnants of the Estate, such stone walls and outdated equipment, which are being supplanted by Lightfoot, a Seaview Farm extension that is constantly growing. The Lightfoot area and Gunthrope's, which were used at the plant during crop season, are divided by a series of dams. It took a lot of water, thus there used to be a pump house next to the bridge that crossed between the two dams. The route itself used to be a dirt road, nearly a cane break, that led to the Seaview Farm town, where many of the industrial workers resided.

In 1715, Lord Archibald Hamilton, the youngest son of the same-named Duke, was described as having "shown more prudence and conduct than maybe was ever seen in so young a gentleman, and as much valour as any man alive." These ideas were mirrored by Codrington in his writings from Antigua. Lord Archibald Hamilton (1673–1744), Douglas Hamilton (1740–1829), Lord Archibald Hamilton (1769–1827), Archibald Hamilton (1790–1815), and Sir Archibald Hamilton were all prominent Scottish politicians who originated from the Hamilton family (1878-1939). John Luffman's map from 1777–1778 depicts the Hon. B. Lightfoot as the owner of the "Harts" plantation in this region.

Henry Benskin Lightfoot passed away in Virginia in 1805. He was born in 1747. The Richmond, Virginia, daily Enquirer published an obituary for him. "Hon. Henry Benskin Lightfoot, formerly of the island of Antigua, died on October 20, 1805, at Richmond, aged about 58." Before to the American Revolution, he worked as a factor for Dreghorn, Murdoch & Company in Prince Edward County, Virginia. Nevertheless, he refused to support the American cause and was granted permission to leave the colony on March 22, 1776. He then relocated to Antigua, where he wed Ann Moore in 1777. In addition, he freed a number of slaves, including a mulatto man named William Hillhouse, a carpenter, two black women named Long Betty and Flora, House servants, two black women named Lydia and Margaret, washers, and a black man named Johnny, a groom. He also left these freed slaves "their usual allowance of food and clothing from my plantation called the Grove and be permitted to live thereon during their respective lives without interruption or molestation provided mentions a "reputed natural [i.e., illegitimate] daughter baptized by the name of Juliana the natural Daughter of Aspasia Merrick" (who herself was the reputed natural daughter of a Thomas Oliver Merrick) "who formerly lived with me as housekeeper" [i.e., Henry impregnated his housekeeper]; in any case, he left Juliana £5,000 (and a bunch more), and once she was 21 or married, many (see below). As well, he says about her "And to the end that the education of my said reputed natural Daughter Juliana may be complete in all respects to make her a well-informed woman, it is my sincere request that she be sent to England as soon as it may be convenient after my death and placed at some respectable School noted for the good education and care of female children, and the allowance for her maintenance and education be liberal and fully sufficient for the purposes aforesaid. He leaves a number (34) of slaves to friends (in addition to Nicholas), including Tom, Harman, Toney, Goodloe, Harpur, Dick, John, Jacob, Pero, Temple, Stapford, Commodore, Glasgow, and Dubling, who are caulkers by trade and are currently working in his Majesty's yard at English Harbour. He also leaves an apprentice to Hamilton, Mulatto Harry Coleman, Neptune, Frank, Mulatto Dick Brown, who are car "Three of my plantations in Antigua, The Grove, Mercer's Creek & Hawes the trustees (as above)" and "and also seven negro slaves following, namely Mimba, Barbara, Mercey, Creet, Lou, polly a washer with her three children Murphy, Frankey and Joe, together with the issue or increase of the females of said slaves." The remainder of his fortune, which includes the Grove, is distributed to his friends John Burke, William Butler, Daniel Hill the younger, Thomas Rogers, Langford Lovell Hodge, George Poindexter, Nicholas Lightfoot, and the eldest living son of Francis Lightfoot, according to his fairly extensive testament. After reviewing a number of maps and determining that it might be the same region, I added "The Grove" to this website. Henry J. Cassin was identified as being from the island of Nevis in ownership documents for The Grove starting in 1878. He married Catherine Watts, a widow, in 1819. A notable author in the West Indies is Freida Cassin, whose work "Quiet Tread," a tale of leprosy, was initially released in Antigua about 1890.

In 1829, Gunthorpe's possessed 280 slaves and 690 acres of land.

A. Harper is listed as the owner in 1933. William Harper (1790–1847), who was born in Antigua but died in South Carolina, immigrated to America where he settled in Charleston. He became a politician working for the rights of South Carolina and was in essence pro–slavery for the benefit of what he believed to be the state's economy. The Harper family is one of the old and respected original families in Antigua. When Alvaro Bento assumed control of Harper's in 1958, it was still a well-known office supply store in Antigua, where it had been established in 1879. RBC (Royal Bank of Canada) began operations in St. John's in 1915, operating out of a two-story wooden structure owned by the Harper family (owners of Harper's Drug Store). moved to High and Market Streets after two years. In 1984, a scholarship fund named after Elizabeth "Bessie" Harper to pursue higher education was created. On their genealogical website, you may view the family tree of the Edwards up to the mid-1900s, with a focus on Thomas Edwards of Comfort Hall, b. 1748. There was no Benjamin Edwards to be found. There is a small burial ground at the former Lightfoot's Estate close to a smaller gulley that runs parallel to Stony Hill Gulley. Only two tiny headstones, though lying down and partially buried, are still discernible. One is unidentified but has the date "25th November Anno Domino 1683" clearly written on it. The stone adjacent to it, which is written in the same vintage font and reads, "...... 17th December.....Here Lyeth Interred the Corpse of Capt. William Abrainn.," suggests that he may have been a pirate.

1941: Cane Returns for the 1941 Harvest from Antigua Sugar Factory, Ltd. 410 tons of cane were provided at a rate of - tons per acre, against an estimated 350 tons, - acres of estate, and - acres of peasant land on the estate. roughly 633 acres in 1921.

Long Island 
The current mill was recently renovated and does not function as intended. "In past times a mill and works on Long Island ruins to be seen," it says under Agriculture in 1842.

The original mill, which was constructed in 1749, was destroyed by 1835.

The Siboney, who arrived on Long Island approximately 400 BC or earlier, were its initial residents. Eventually, between 400 B.C. and 600 AD, the Arawak people appeared. The Spanish drove them out in the 1520s, but the Caribs, who had arrived around 1,000 years earlier, kept raiding the islands until 1674. A very high grade flint that has been used for centuries by Amerindians and is still accessible across the Caribbean Island chain comes exclusively from Long Island. One of the home owners converted Flinty Bay into a sand beach, therefore it is no longer there. "When I was a kid visiting Long Island, we would always stop at Flinty Bay to relax, close our eyes, and listen to the tinkling sound of the waves playing in the flint."

The Environmental Awareness Group, WIDECAST (the Wider Caribbean Sea Turtle Conservation Network), and the Jumby Bay Hawksbill Project team launched the project in the late 1980s. In 2015, the 29th year of research at Jumby Bay, about 450 nesting hawksbills were tagged and identified, with many long-time hens still coming back to lay eggs alongside newcomers. Since 1996, when people began hunting for their exquisite shells to use in sunglasses and jewelry, the Hawkesbill turtle has been listed as severely endangered. Turtle eggs were prized as a delicacy, and turtle meat used to be sold in the marketplace.

The Hawkesbill turtle needs all the assistance it can get because only one in a thousand of them live to adulthood.

Maj. William Byam served as Governor of Surinam from 1654 to 17 February 1667. Surinam was eventually turned over to the Dutch by the Brits, and Byam was forced to travel to Antigua "with considerable tribulation" because the French had destroyed the island.

William Byam's youngest son, Edward Byam, was born in Surinam in 1662. He was appointed Lieutenant Governor of Antigua in 1715 and Governor of the Leeward Islands in 1715, positions he held until his death on December 4, 1741. He wed Mary Winthrope, and the two of them had two kids. Antigua native Edward Byam and Mary Byam were born in 1685. (b.1690 Antigua). They had five children: George Byam (1704–1744), William Byam (1706–1755), Alice Byam (b.1711), and Lydia Byam. Subsequently, he remarried to Lydia Thomas in Antigua in 1703. (b.1713).

The Private Act No. 116 of 1700. An Act authorizing and permitting the Honorable Edward Byam Esq. and John Otto, Gentleman, to sell and dispose of a particular island off Parham Harbour known as Long Island and 38 acres in the Falmouth Division.

Thomas Jarvis (d. 1805) 1750, owner of Long Island and Mount Jarvis, also acquired Blizards with his first wife Jane Whitehead (d.1797). His alias was Joshua.

In 1716, Thomas Jarvis took over ownership of Popeshead, his father-in-land law's in Antigua; the sugar plantation flourished and remained in the family for 200 years. In the end, the estates encompassed Long Island, Bird Island, and 1000 acres in the parishes of St. John and St. George. With Jarvis' passing in 1747, his eldest son Thomas (1722–1785) received the estate. Thomas worked in Antigua's administration until rising to the position of Chief Judge of the Court of Common Pleas. The younger Thomas and Rachel Thibou had a large family that included James Nibbs Jarvis, Bertie Entwisle Jarvis, George Ralph Payne Jarvis, and Thomas Jarvis III (1784c-1807) (1794-1842). Thomas Jarvis (1835–1877), a son of James and Lorne Campbell, served on Antigua's General Legislative Council.

Indenture, 1755. Thomas Jarvis is forbidden from sending any slaves that are part of Esther's (Jacob Thibou's widow) dower elsewhere than from Antigua to Long Island or from Long Island to Antigua without paying a £50 fine for each slave.

1800s: The Long Island sugar plantation and factories were in operation up until the 1800s, when they were abandoned. Several of the emancipated slaves were given access to the Island in 1835 so they could cultivate food. Frank Henzell began operating it as a sheep ranch in 1940, expanding the original "black head" herd, which dates back to the 1500s. Bob Davis founded The Arawak Company, Ltd. in 1966 and later sold it to Homer G. Williams in 1979. The premium Jumby Bay Resort, which offers hotels, villas, and private houses, is currently located on Long Island.

1920s: "Grandmother sent Joyce Henzell to school and then returned from a trip to the UK. She arrived a day early and discovered her husband with a woman (a factory secretary) and declared she would never enter that home again. The second (front) house was constructed during this time. Subsequently, a metal causeway connecting the two homes' second floors was built. Stuart, Len Moody.

The Antigua Sugar Factory, Ltd. leased Long Island in 1951 to serve as a staff vacation destination. Hurricane damage from the 1950s required roughly £1,000 in repairs, which ASF with ASE accomplished while maintaining the house at $50 per month for seven years. Owner of Long Island, Frank Henzell, left his position as assistant manager at the Tomlinson's business in 1951.

"I'll even take the risk of painting for you a picture of the times: 1961 The reception was held in my father's home, the manager's house at the Antigua Sugar Plant, and I was married to Robert Meeker, a lieutenant at the US Navy Base here in Antigua, in the Anglican Cathedral. After the ceremonies were complete, Bob's best man, Jack Johnson, and my maid of honor, Vonnie Delisle, escorted us to Parham's Jordan pier so we could travel to Long Island at around 10 o'clock. After crossing the North Sound Bridge to begin the night, we ran out of gas. Jack stood in the middle of the road in the dead of night to wave down and commandeer the closest passing vehicle, which he did. I never knew whose car we utilized, but he reportedly relinquished it without a fight. It was very dark out, and a boatman was waiting to carry us over to Long Island at Jordan's pier. The boat was modest and had an outboard motor, and as we circled Umbrella Point, a fierce squall descended upon us. Bob had to take over operating the boat since the boatman became uneasy and holed up; while I tried to maneuver from the bow, Bob's watch stopped working after that. You could hardly see in front of you, and we may have passed out to sea if Uncle Frank Henzell weren't there on the wharf at Long Island with a lantern and the tractor. He gave us a ride up to the rear home with our baggage and supplies, which included a case of wine and a box of crab backs. He was chilled and drenched to the bone. He had earlier switched off the generator, so he left us on our own with a lantern. There was only one little kerosene fridge on the island, so Bob and I had to go back to Parham the following morning to pick up the maid, additional supplies, and a number of live chickens. For the ten days we were on Long Island, Douglas Macandrew had lent us his outboard boat, which allowed us to visit the outlying islands during the day. We were island confined for ten days with visits from Uncle Frank during happy hour, which was a great opportunity to get to know one another. The only exceptions were everyone coming for a large picnic and water skiing on the Sunday and us traveling to the mainland for Bob's birthday one evening. Along with the chickens and crab legs we brought, Uncle Frank also killed one of his lambs while we were there, so we had fresh lamb on the menu."

"We frequently spent summer vacations on Long Island with the Turner family, as previously noted (cousins). After a very busy and active day on the island, you just found a location and left like a light in the room with mattresses on the floor. We hiked everywhere, searched for messages in a bottle, popped light bulbs with stones, and hunted for land tortoises as well as the magnificent glass balls that would wash up on the shore from Portuguese fishing nets. We swam in the ocean in between and arrived for dinner. The boys would catch one or two eels and pickle them with rock salt on the galvanized roof to be consumed later. You should be on the lookout for an octopus between the rocks since they loved to throw it at the girls and make it "suck" on them."

"With our fathers, we would go fishing and be the ones to go in and grab the fish while it was still dazed. When the mosquitoes were terrible, we had to collect green shrub for bushfires to get rid of the bothersome vermin, which almost got us too. Through the night, the grownups engaged in card games."

Today, Long Island is the exclusive Jumby Bay Resort thanks to homebuyers who have bought land and constructed lovely residences all around the island's perimeter.

The old estate home, which once included two structures—one of which was erected under L. Henzell's reign—has been transformed into the Jumby Bay Resort's restaurant. The two homes on the second floor were connected by a metal ramp. Sea Island Cotton was grown on Long Island after sugar, and black head sheep were later cultivated. Documents also demonstrate the raising of livestock. Old copper is in front of the mill, and there is still the old sundial and water drippers (limestone carvings that let water to permeate or drip gently through, purifying the water for consumption).

As recently as the 1960s, there were also three grave headstones on the bluff south of Jumby Bay (thus the name), but they are now gone. Sam Payne, the elderly boatman, continues to haunt the original southerly building. Sam's death was anticipated to cause him to "walk," therefore tacks were fastened onto the bottoms of his feet to stop him. It was believed that if he stood up, he would be unable to "walk." This, however, did not succeed, and Sam, a massive black man who frequently rattles chains, has appeared to numerous people.

Joslyn (née Lake) (nee Lake) Evelyn was informed that the slaves from Royal's Estate were buried there, which is how it came to be known as Jumby Bay.

Millars 
On this location in the bushes, across from the road that round the airport and enters Fitches Creek, there is still a mill operating. This estate didn't adopt steam technology.

Although much of the site was destroyed, some of the airport runway was rebuilt, and the ruins of the buff house may still be seen next to the runway as planes take off or land. Once you enter Fitches Creek below the mill, a three chamber "dungeon" is located against the hill. Later, it was utilized to store ammunition for use in World War II and corn.

Dr. William Millar was accepted as a physician and guilds brother of Ayr in 1767. He was from Paisley, Renfrew, Scotland.

Inside the perimeter gate of the airport are the remains of the Estate House, which was converted into an officers' club for the American Forces stationed there during World War II in 1943c. Three homes—Hill, Gray's the Camacho House in St. John's, which later served as the Bishop Lodge for the Catholic church, and Millar's buff home—all had 100 windows. Just below the mill, a little distance away from St. George's church, are the ruins of the dungeons and a sizable well/cistern that has been cordoned off for safety. The dungeon, a two-room stone building, served as a place where slaves were punished. Eventually, it was utilized to store ammunition and subsequently corn. Bands of men stopped cane cutters at Morris Looby's, Donovan's, Millar's, and Cassandra Gardens during the 1918 riots.

The Slave Registry indicates that Alexander Milllar (1791–1841), son of Dr. William Milllar, resided in Antigua between 1824 and 1832. The genealogical website for Alexander Millar contains this list.

297 slaves were housed on 406 acres at Millar's in 1829. 93,929 acres in 1921.

1837: Mr. Bourne was in charge.

Every plantation featured a dungeon for rebellious slaves during the slave trade. While we were leaving Millar's, we inquired with Mr. B about the fate of the dungeons. I'll show you one, he immediately responded. We arrived at the old prison's door in a matter of minutes; it was a compact, solidly constructed stone structure with only two cells. The stables, pig stalls, and cattle pens surrounding it gave it a gloomy appearance. The entry was partially blocked off with masonry work, and the door was off its hinges. The sheep and goats freely entered and exited. James A. Thomas published Emancipation in the West Indies in 1837.

Antigua Almanac states that Millar's 405 acres belonged to Samuel Martin's heirs in 1851.

Alexander Millar had 406 acres in St. George's Parish in 1852; they later belonged to the late Sir Oliver Nugent and are currently owned by Charles C. Lees.

1860: Sir Oliver Nugent purchased the "Millar's" estate at Fitches Creek. He and his wife Louise Ottley of Parham Lodge resided there and oversaw the farm's substantial sugar output. The Codringtons and Robert and Henry Jefferson and Co. of Whitehaven were two absentee landowners that Sir Oliver, a planter, defended for almost 40 years. He seems to have played a significant role in the manufacture and exportation of molasses from Antigua. 406 acres made up Millar's in 1829, and 929 acres did so by 1921. Although never switching to steam, it had the highest sugar production on the entire island in 1836. The estate was given to Sir Oliver's son-in-law and former governor of the Leeward Islands, Sir Charles Cameron Lees (married to Maria Nugent). After being later purchased by the Camacho family, it was rented out to the US air force as an officers' club during World War II.

Sir Charles Lees was commissioned into the 1st West India Regiment initially, but in 1854 he was transferred to the 76th Foot. From 1884 to 1885, he served as the Leeward Islands' governor.

1940s: Mrs. Johnny Camacho used to grow "Pon Ron" roses and sent a lovely arrangement into town every Saturday for the altar at the Catholic Church.

Cane Returns for the 1941 Crop from Antigua Sugar Plant, Ltd., according to Millar's. estimated 91 tons, 209 acres of farmland, 40 acres of farmland occupied by peasants, and tons of cane delivered at a rate of 12.05 tons per acre.

Mrs. E.J. Camacho's wife and executrix, Alexander Aloysius Camacho, in 1943.

"Before the invention of the telephone in the 1940s, it was customary to "go visiting" for tea at 4:00 pm, and Mrs. Camacho was quite concerned about how you were dressed. You had to don gloves and hand the maid your calling card before she handed it to Mrs. Camacho on a silver tray and invited you inside. Finding out if the person you were going to visit would be at home or out visiting themselves became customary. In this manner, you could appear to return a visit as politeness dictated without having to put yourself through the inconvenience of making a real visit."

1943: The Estate House's ruins are located inside the airport's perimeter fence, and about that time, the Camacho house was converted into an officers' club for the US Forces stationed there during World War II. Wife and executrix of Mrs. E.J. Camacho's estate, Alexander Aloysius Camacho.

2008 saw the demolition of Millar's buff house's final remnants as part of the airport's expansion. Nonetheless, the mill, dungeons, and well are still present.

Nibb's 
The mill, which can be seen from the road not far from the Free Trade Zone buildings, is in outstanding condition save from a tree growing out of the top. To the north is Will Blizard's, to the east is Hight Point (High), to the west is Gravenor's, and to the south is Winthorpes.

There is no proof that this estate switched to using steam. The Antigua & Barbuda Defence Force is based at Camp Blizard, which used to be Stephen Blizard's estate and a US Army Base during World War II before becoming a US Naval Base.

1788: According to Boyce Ledwell Esq(d. .'s 1794) testament, he resided at the Nibbs estate and intended to buy it for his family. He was Ledwell of the Antigua-based Ledwell & Scott firm, which held a number of estates.

1829: The estate had 140 slaves and 131 acres in 1829.

1835: It is noted that a total of £297 was paid for all four of the following claims when owners were reimbursed by the Crown for slaves liberated following liberation. Eliza C. Nibbs held 13 slaves, Mary H. Nibbs owned 6, Ann Nibbs owned 1, Dorothy Nibbs owned 2, and Dorothy Nibbs owned 2.

Up until 1808, according to records, the Nibbs family maintained a cemetery near Barnacle Point (the eastern end of the airport runway). A 1700s-era Nibbs gravestone and a father and daughter Collins headstone were discovered at the site after it was recently damaged by a digger in 2007. These tombstones were delivered to Betty's Hope, where it is intended to display a cemetery of tombstones that were saved from development and the backhoe.

An intriguing side note is that this estate is allegedly the setting for Jane Austen's "Mansfield Park" novel. James Langford Nibbs and her father George Austen were close friends from 1765 through 1819. James L. Nibbs, who frequented the Austen residence, is presumed to have related the West Indian plantation experiences that served as the inspiration for the author's novel.

When James Langford Nibbs of Antigua attended St. John's College in Oxford for his education, George taught him. Nibbs also named George as the principal trustee of his Antigua estate. Jane's older brother has James Langford Nibbs as a godfather. In her book Mansfield Park, she referenced Antigua.

According to the Antigua Almanac from 1851, Samuel Martin's heirs own a Nibb's of 121 acres.

The mill, which is a part of the Freetrade Zone, was formerly a US Navy Station after 1944.

George Savage Martin, 1789–1849. He filed a lawsuit as the executor of Samuel Martin (named as his father) on the Nibbs estate in Antigua in addition to seeking compensation for eleven persons who had been held as slaves there. unsuccessful executor of Samuel Martin and claimant for the High Point estate.

According to the documentation underpinning the disputed estate claim for Nibbs, John Halliday Martin's father Samuel Martin (q.v.) was also his father (b.1782).

The Bennett-Bryson Company Ltd. included merchant and planter George W. Bennett (d. 1879). In 1833, Lloyd's dispatched John Bennett as a representative; today, Bryson's continues that tradition.

1943: George W. Bennett had acquired numerous sugar estates of his own, but Bryson's served as agents for a total of 11 sugar farms. These included Blubber Valley & Rose Valley, which had 1164 acres of steamworks, Claremont, which had 849 acres of steamworks, High Point, which had 212 acres, and Nibb's, which had 131 acres. Also, he leased Jolly Hill, which has a steamworks on 708 acres, and Golden Grove, which has 254 acres, from Rev. Thomas Peters.

North Sound

Paynter's/Painter's 
In Painter's, a mill is no longer there. Hurricanes had already caused damage to the estate house, which was eventually destroyed when Sunnyside School, founded by Maryellen Wilson (who was born in the Antigua Sugar Mill), built their auditorium. The cow corral at the bottom of the road is currently all that is left. When the school was first constructed, different school musicals and presentations were staged in the gallery of the ancient house with its front steps. "It was delightful to see the kids perform from the chairs set up in a line on the lawn in front, all in the open air."

Lieutenant Edmond Paynter (d. 1711) received a patent in 1678 for 123 acres.

1789: William Gunthorpe possessed 278 acres under the name Painters.

This estate had 278 acres and 148 slaves in 1789.

Col. Wlm Paynter, owner of "Painter's" of 278 acres, passed away in 1736.

A Mr. John Hatchford is said to have attempted to slander and vilify William Gunthorpe by recounting an incident involving the cart-whipping of a pregnant female slave. During the time, Gunthorpe served as Governor Sir James Leith's aide-de-camp. He was informed that his services would no longer be required. He clothed one of his own negro lads in his uniform and sent him on an ass to deliver the abovementioned note after obtaining this instruction. After receipt, Sir James Leith carried out the governor's explicit directive and saw to it that Gunthorpe was charged with cruelty.

Comprised 94 slaves and 272 acres in 1829.

1851: The Antigua Almanac lists K. H. Osborn, M.D. as the owner of Paynter's 272 acres.

1852: Kean Osborn, M.D., owned Orange Valley, which was 735 acres in St. Mary's, Bodkin's, which was 412 acres, Room's, which was 318 acres, Paynter's, which was 272 acres, and Carlisle's, which was 388 acres in St. George's.

Three DuBuissons (James Memoth DuBuisson, Mrs. Edith Manus DuBuisson, and William Herman DuBuisson), Alexander Moody-Stuart, and Judith Gwendolyn Moody-Stuart received 18,000 shares of the Antigua Sugar Estates at a price of £1 apiece in 1940. When George Moody-Stuart was offered shares but turned them down, it represented the ultimate transition to the next generation (Antigua Syndicate Estates minutes, 4 January 1940; 1 May 1940). The "Gunthorpe's" estates, including Cassandra Garden, Paynter's, Tomlinson's, Fitche's Creek, Donovan's, Gunthorpe's, North Sound, Cedar Valley, Galley Bay, and Five Islands, would be under the ownership of the new corporation.

The central Antigua Sugar Plant (Gunthorpe's), which was completed in 1945, was run for many years by Leonard Henzell, who was also in charge of installing the narrow gauge railway needed to transport cane from remote places. He leased the home at Paynter's, which the Antigua Syndicate Estates, Ltd. acquired in 1943, and the agreed-upon amount was paid in shares of comparable value. The Lena, The Joan (which was renovated and is still operating in Wales on the Welshpool and Llanfair Light Railway), The Judy, The Marion, and The Bessie were all locomotives that bore his or the Moody Stuart daughters' names. Under an MOU with the government and Lawrence Gameson of the UK, four different kinds of locomotives, including "Marion," were removed from the jungle in 2011. They were then restored statically and are now on display in the Museum yard on Long Street. His daughter, Judy Henzell, married Alexander Moody-Stuart, who oversaw the Syndicate Estates, and one of his five sons, Frank Henzell (1908-1965), received the inheritance and resided on Long Island until his passing in 1965.

1943: The Syndicate seized control of the Paynters residence, which is currently leased by Mr./Mrs. Henzell. On the same terms as they are currently held, the house should be taken over.

The glass bead curtain that separated the dining room and living room always fascinated kids, who were often warned not to play with it. Grandma Henzell practiced her shooting by tossing cans into the air from the east gallery. View Long Island (#68) for further details. Stuart, Len Moody.

The Antigua and Barbuda Syndicate Estates, Ltd (Vesting) Act and the Lands of Antigua and Barbuda Sugar Factory, Limited were both passed on December 30, 1969.

The entirety of the about one-acre tract of land that is a portion of Paynter's, as described in the Certificate of Title No. 49211965, dated December 20, 1965, and entered in Register Book H1 Folio 110.

Sherwood’s/Lebanon’s 
In this location, there is no longer a mill. Just north of Stoney Hill, Sherwood's is situated between Gunthorpe's and Cedar Hill. Northeast of Midway Gas Station, about a mile off of Freeman's Road, is Sherwood Forest. Court, Tomboy, and Hercules plotted the 1736 insurrection in Stoney Hill Gulley, which is close by. Petrified wood from an ancient forest, much of which has been removed, is also abundant in the area. The image of "Sherwood's" is taken from a 1734 Herman Moll map.

In 1668, a Mr. Garrett Sherwood obtained permission from Lord Willoughby to have 36 acres surveyed.

In Vere Oliver's book Antigua and the Antiguans, there are various notes about Richard Sherwood, an immigrant to Virginia, US. His eldest daughter Margaret wed James Berry, the rector of Saint George's, while his two daughters Blisse and Mary both passed away before their father. In Antigua, George Symes (1667-1723) wed Elizabeth Sherwood (1672-1724), but like Richard Sherwood, he later moved to Virginia.

According to "Works of America," a certain John Otter, who appears to have caused a lot of trouble for the Justice of the Peace after spending five times in the stocks, prevents a repeat by giving the unfortunate Otter as a present to two Virginia merchants to work as a slave for them for seven years.

Given the succession of Archibald Hamiltons from Scottish statesman Lord Archibald (1673–1744) onward, it is unknown which Archibald Hamilton actually bought Sherwoods in 1750. When writing from Antigua, Codrington repeated same sentiments: "Let me remark that Lord Archibald Hamilton has showed tremendous energy, and garnered respect and admiration, both is fleet and army. While he was my aide-de-camp in St. Christopher's and Lieutenant-Colonel of the Marines in Guadeloupe, he had a resolve befitting a man of his caliber and a level of judgment that was years beyond his years. 1691.

From Lord Archibald Hamilton (1673-1754), Douglas Hamilton (1740-1819), Lord Archibald (1769-1827), Archibald (1790-1815), and Sir Archibald Hamilton (1879-1939), who converted to Islam, Scottish politicians have run in the family. The estates of Lightfoot, Sherwood, and Barter belonged to the Hamilton family.

There is a 1725 indenture between Richard Sherwood and Archibald Hamilton, his wife Mary, and themselves.

1943: The Antigua Syndicate Estates leased the land known as Sherwood's Pasture next to North Sound, and Mr. DuBuisson offered to buy it for £100.

2016: The government of Antigua & Barbuda recently declared that it would act swiftly to prove ownership of land at Sherwood's Estate, which it claims was purchased "decades ago." The government also issued a warning to those who also claim ownership of the land, ordering them to cease commercial activity on the property. Regrettably, the government didn't do the formal transfer of the land's title into Crown years ago as it was supposed to.

Weir’s (Ware’s/Glanville’s/Little Zoar) 
There is still a mill there, and it's in great shape. There is no evidence that this estate has ever switched to steam. The Hugh Marshall family has renovated the historic estate house and constructed a number of new homes nearby.

The Antigua Sugar Plant (Gunthorpe's), which used to discharge its waste water via weirs into Fitche's Creek, had an extremely offensive odor during the growing season. Nonetheless, it was something one simply got used to, as Kitty (née Lake) and Peter Yarnold, who had resided on the estate, claimed.

1679: "Harvie Keynell, Esq., leases to John Weir, a merchant, "Little Zoar" in the St. John Division of 350 acres for 21 years in exchange for £10,000 the first year, £15,000 the second year, and £20,000 the third year, as well as £80,000 in debt repayment. Here is a schedule: 20 black people, 30 sheep, 22 cattle, 3 Christian servants, and 2 horses.

Harvey Keynell was given a 21-year lease on 350 acres by Captain John Weir in 1704.

Col. Robt. Weir, who died in 1748, sold Edward Chester "Little Zoar," a parcel of 223 acres in St. John's Division, in 1704.

Because he was afraid to live in Zoar, Lot left that city and moved with his two daughters to a mountain where they lived in a cave.

John Rose of Antigua, a merchant, and Robert Weir sign an agreement in 1710 whereby the latter agrees to lease to the former his plantation in New North Sound, which was formerly under the control of William Glanville of Antigua, a merchant, for a term of twelve years at a rate of 300 pounds per year.

1720: "Robert Weir's Will, dated February 4, 1720. My kid Alex saw a horse and a black boy. To James, my son, £30. To my son Thomas, a 16-year-old black lad. $25 to my son Walter. To Eleanor Weir, my daughter, she was a black girl. For my daughter Elizabeth Weir, a 17-year-old black girl. My entire estate goes to my wife, Cristobella."

"In case George Lucas Osborne recover my estate called "Glanville," now known as "Weir's,".....but if he also recover my estate called "Zoar's"...." reads Walter Weir's will from 1748.

There is a second estate called "Glanville's" but only one called "Weir's" (for example, there are two Cochran's: "Cochran's" and "Cochran's (Bethesda)").

Prince Klaas (King Court) was the "chief slave" that Thomas Kerby held. He transported him from his estate, Parry's, to his townhouse in St. John's, which was located just beneath the old Courthouse (now the Museum of Antigua & Barbuda). He traveled with him between his plantations and town as his chief groom. In order to prepare the slave uprising of 1736, he was in an ideal position of trust to meet with slaves from neighboring plantations. On that identical spot, a two-story building still exists in St. John's, and the stables were situated on the parking lot to the south of the building. This is the location of Farara's former bottling facility, which later evolved into the Lemon Tree eatery and is now the Meinl Bank. The Museum of Antigua & Barbuda is located right adjacent to the Court House, which used to be the location of the Sunday market where a lot of slaves congregated to sell their food and other supplies. One of Antigua's National Heroes is Prince Klaas.

Thomas Norbury Kerby bequeathed "Parry" and "Weir's" in his 1810 will for his daughter Anne Byam Kerby (d. 1842 UK).

Weir's owned 184 slaves and 422 acres in 1829.

Weir's of 136 acres is listed in the 1851 Antigua Almanac as being owned by Miss Ottley.

1852: F.B. Ottley possessed the 134-acre "Diamond" in St. Peter's Parish, which was at the time. Miss Ottley owned "Weir's" (136 acres) and George W. Ottley owned "Parry's" (22 acres) in St. George's Parish.

"Today I received a letter from Charles Matheson, Esq., Kirby Ware's manager, inviting me to the estate to bury William Ford, a black physician and member of the Society..."

At least three hundred slaves walked arm in arm with great order and were noticeably neat and clean on the inside of their bodies as the Manager and I took the lead in the funeral procession.

Francis Byam Ottley is descended from the St. Kitts-born Richard Otley family (b. 1730). Large tracts of land were also possessed by the Ottley family in St. Vincent. According to the evidence, F.B. Ottley owned Diamond (#87), Miss Ottley owned Weirs, and George W. Ottley owned Parry's (#88).

1878 According to a note from the Sedgwick ancestry website, Elizabeth Sedgwick and her son Samuel bought 45 slaves for £774 19s on October 19, 1835. Henry Sedgwick of Nevis, a surgeon, was the first Sedgwick to be mentioned in Antigua in 1685, and by the middle of the eighteenth century, a Samuel Sedgwick possessed 113 acres in St. Paul's Parish and 35 acres in St. Mary's Parish. The names of the estates are not expressly stated anywhere. Lena, the wife of Leonard Henzell (Paynter, #61), was a Sedgwick.

A ledger with an iron grill honoring Samuel Sedgwick, who passed away in 1800, Elizabeth Sedgwick, who passed away in 1842, and other family members is located in the churchyard of St. John. Many members of the Sedgwick family are interred in St. George's churchyard in a grouping of six graves, including Samuel Jarvis Sedgwick, who died in 1881.

The father of Joseph Francis (1933) had a store in Long Lane. The Antigua Distillery was founded by the Portuguese in the neighborhood, who frequently owned or ran the estate shops or rum shops on the island and joined together to produce Cavalier and English Harbour rum.

In 1940, Mr. DeSouza Jardin, the owner of Weirs, authorized the Antigua Sugar Mill to use water from his spring to finish the crop. The result of two years without "pond showers" was a severe drought.

1940: Mr. DeSouza Jardin, the proprietor, authorized ASF to use water from his spring to finish the crop. A significant issue has arisen as a result of two years without "pond rains".

1941: A $2,135.76 water conservation project at Weir's was approved, with the main goal of supplying the U.S. Base Authorities as well as the right to use by nearby estates. The reservoir was constructed with assistance from The Syndicate. The contractor will pump raw water into the storage reservoir at Weirs from a sizable spring called Weir's Spring, which is located about two miles south of the base site. 5,000 to 10,000 gal. per day to the Base at a price of 35 cents per gallon for the first 10,000 gallons and 5 cents less for each additional 10,000 gallons.

Cane Returns for the 1941 Crop from Antigua Sugar Plant, Ltd. Weir's. 690 tons of cane were delivered at a rate of 13.14 tons per acre, out of an estimated 719 tons, on a 52 1/2 acre estate with peasants.

1943: Syndicate recommended that the lease for Weirs be renewed under the same conditions that are now in place. This was Syndicate's lease from the property's owner, Caroline Francis.

1950s: Weirs estate was administered by Godfrey Maginley (died in 1956).

Mrs. Francis owned Weirs in 1951. (Aunt of Eugene Jardine). Once Mrs. Caroline Francis passed away on May 29, 1958, the Syndicate used their option to buy Weirs for $11,500. The Firm had rented it for a number of years.

At the Gunthorpes Sugar Factory (ASF), the runoff water was directed past weirs to the stream during crop time, and the entire area reeked foul. This area was referred to as "factory lee Pond," which indicated stink. When someone said your breath smelled like "lee pond," they were referring to your foul breath.

"I have memories of visiting the Maginley family when they used to reside at Weirs. They stated that the rancid smell from the run-off water would cause all of their silver to turn black."

1950s: "We used to go after a heavy rain to gather land crabs down the road to Weirs off the main road where the loco line crossed at the Northsound bridge. We looked forward to going there every evening as entertainment because it was close to the factory where we were raised. We would take a detour off the main route to Weirs while carrying flambeau (a pipe loaded with a lighted kerosene-soaked rag). The marsh was to the right, and when the crabs crossed the road, they were easily ambushed because the flambeau's brightness rendered them blind. Yet, no one wanted to be in charge of the bag because if you draped it over your shoulder, one of the gundies was liable to give you a nice squeeze. After the crabs had been cleansed and fattened for 10 days to create crab back, my stepmother Elaine Watson would then have us all "choose" the crabs."

"By the time we were done, our hands would be severely bruised from working all morning. Although everyone enjoyed crab back, the labour required almost made us stop crabbing."

Hugh Marshall & Co. was a law company. Hugh Marshall, Sr. founded the law company Hugh Marshall & Co. in 1991. Businessman and former Labour Party representative owns the Weir's estate home and the adjacent property, which contains the sugar mill. The original estate house has been surrounded by a number of dwellings.

Will Blizard’s 
This mill is starting to degrade and fall apart.

Nothing else of the estate is left because the US Navy Station was built so extensively on the land. The mansion was perfectly placed close on the water, with a view of Maiden and Long Island.

1750: Thomas Jarvis, also known as Joshua, who owned Long Island and Mount Jarvis and shared possession of Blizard's with his wife in 1750. (Jane Whitehead d.1797).

18 September 1789: "William Blizard Will plantation in North Sound to my Ex'ors in Trust to give 1/3 of the income to my sister Mary Bowers for her life, and subsequently to son Christopher 1/3 to my sister of Mgt. Wendall and 1/2 to my nephew John Donaldson.

The estate had 90 acres and shared its slaves with another plantation in 1829.

The Folly, Mount Pleasant, Blizard's, and Samuel Byams are the four estates or plantations that Alexander Willock, Francis Willock, and Frank Gore Willock owned in 1829.

90 acres owned by Will Blizard in 1843 by Messrs. W & F Shand.

1851: According to the Antigua Almanac, Messrs. W. & F. Shand owned 90 acres, according to Blizard's will.

Francis Shand (d. 1868) was a West India trader, Liverpool shipowner, and Antiguan businessman. He was Charles & William Shand's son and business partner from 1826 to 1838, and he later claimed to be an East India trader. Francis Shand married Lydia Byam in St. George's Parish in 1837. They had 13 kids in total.

1941: In order to assist the Navy Air Base at Crabbs and Coolidge Air Base, this property was leased to the US Army during World War II. In order to defend the Panama Canal from German submarines, a ring of facilities in the Caribbean was constructed, extending from British Guiana in the south to Trinidad, St. Lucia, Antigua, Jamaica, and one of the outlying islands of the Bahamas. As one of the deals of the century, the financially strapped British handed the Americans ninety-nine-year leases on eight base locations in exchange for fifty rebuilt but outdated destroyers. The smallest of these, Antigua, was chosen as the focal point for anti-submarine patrols due to its strategic location where submarines were becoming a greater threat. At the time, the Americans' $4 million investment was a sizable influx. Hence, the bases provided the first viable alternative to the sugar business for the Antiguan work force and gave the entire economy a much-needed boost. There was a lot of submarine activity, making Antigua's location important. In addition, all movement into and out of Guadeloupe, which was then under Vichy control, had to be closely watched. Enemy subs trying to reach the shipping lanes leading to Trinidad and Curacao (where there were oil refineries), Guantanamo, Cuba, and the Panama Canal all had to pass close to Antigua.

The Army Air Base was to be located in Coolidge, while the Naval Air Station was to be located at Crabbs.

The later project, which included Millar's, High Point, and Winthorpe's as well as Will Blizard's, where the principal buildings were located, began construction on May 13, 1941. There were four gates, including the Base or West Gate at Carlisle, the north gate next to the former Antigua Beach Hotel, the south gate immediately west of St. George's, and a fourth gate at Judge's near Barnes Hill. The entire region was enclosed.

A portion of the post was revived in 1956 for a Naval facility and space tracking station at the Air Force Base after it was deactivated following the war and the airstrip (Coolidge, which is now VC Bird International Airport) was granted to Antigua.

For £80 16s 5d, The Syndicate Estates sold land to the Government of the Leeward Islands so that "Blizard's Village" (now New Winthorpes) could be established. The land came from Cedar Valley, formerly Giles Blizard's.

1995 saw the closure of the Navy Base and the transfer of the buildings to the Government of Antigua and Barbuda for use as the headquarters of the Antigua and Barbuda Defense Force.

The US Defense Area was amended by an Act (agreement) in 1969.

After gaining independence in 1981, the Antigua & Barbuda Defense Force was established. The Antigua Defense Force was a volunteer organization before that. The protection of the sugar planters was its primary objective. The Antigua and Barbuda Defense Force now guards the populace. Its responsibilities include search and rescue missions, ceremonial duties, internal security, and the prevention of smuggling. In the army and navy, there were 170 men and 125 women in 2004. The Coast Guard is a part of the Ministry of Defense, which also comprises the Defense Force.

At Camp Blizard, there were two locomotives from the Antigua Sugar Plant (2007). Following their removal to the Government mechanic's shop on Factory Road in 2013, they were refurbished and transported to the Museum of Antigua & Barbuda, where they are on exhibit in the courtyard, thanks to an MOU with the Ministry of Tourism and Lawrence Gameson. They will be moved to the estate grounds if Betty's Hope creates a space to showcase them.

Winthorpes 
Although there isn't a mill there anymore, this location is nonetheless interesting because the Winthrop family from Massachusetts landed there rather than someone from Britain, as was customary. The interplay between the then-existing colonies—including Australia—connected by sailing ships and familial ties was depicted in part. Isaac Royal, owner of the neighboring Royal's estate, was likewise a native of Massachusetts and Virginia, where both of his families owned huge tracts of land, cotton and tobacco plantations, and ships. As letters from Walter Tullideph to Governor Thomas indicate, the northern part of the island, where Winthrop's house situated, was relatively flat terrain and subject to periods of drought. The island's airport was created there using the original American infrastructure while it was also a part of the American base during World War II.

There are at least two different ways to spell Winthrop.

Named after Samuel Winthrop, Esq., an early deputy governor of Antigua (about 1650). When the Americans leased the property for a Base there in 1943, the village of Winthorpes was relocated to its current location of New Winthorpes near Barnes Hill after the airfield was established during WWII. At the end of the runway, among the bushes, Sir George Walter recalls a cemetery or graves enclosed by a wrought iron fence. Although it has been established that this is Lord Lavington's burial from Carlisle's estate, it is uncertain if they are still there.

John Winthrop, a Puritan who had fled religious persecution in England, made his home in New England in 1630. When he was elected governor of Massachusetts, he believed that it was divinely-ordained (and God-given) that native Americans "be swept out by the little poxe," paving the way for European settlers to colonize and acquire territory. He obtained Red Hill Farm, the property, in this way.

Male Pequot Nation children were taken to Bermuda after one of the Indian Wars, while the women and maid children were disposed of in the town. 700 Pequot adults, children, and women were killed or taken prisoner in all. 15 male and 2 female war prisoners were shackled and manacled in Boston after the conclusion of the first war against the Indians, and they were then marched aboard the Salem ship "Desire" to be sold as slaves in the West Indies. They were exchanged for supplies of cotton, tobacco, and a group of Africans in (Antigua and Barbados). The sale of black people in New England was first documented in this year, 1638.

Before the end of the 1600s, more than 1200 members of the Pequot and Narragansett tribes of Native Americans were sold into slavery.

Three boys, Henry (b. 1649) Joseph (b. before 1638), and Samuel, were born to John Winthrop (b.bef. 1657). He left his estate in New North Sound, Antigua, better known as Groton Hall Plantation, to his three eldest sons as well as his wife Elizabeth when he passed away about 1674.

"To my son Henry Winthrop my part of Barbuda and all the stock there," says Elizabeth Winthrop in her testament from 1676. All of the money I have in Europe, as well as Long Island, my land in St. John's, my storage facilities, and my grey Barbuda horse, go to my son Samuel. For a tankard, my daughter Elizabeth Williams will pay me £6 in pounds. At the age of 16, I gave my daughter Sarah Jones £10,000, my side saddle, two black people, my silver porringer, and all of my wardrobe. I owe £4,000 and my enormous Bible to Quaker Jonas Langford for his thoughtfulness in taking care of me during my illness. My departed husband Samuel Winthrop left me a portion of Groton Hall Plantation in his will, on the condition that my son Stephen Winthrop pay legacies, among other things.

The sale of the late Captain Samuel Winthrop's property in New North Sound, known as Groton Hall, was made possible by an act that was passed in 1677 by Mr. Henry Winthrop and Lieutenant Samuel Winthrop.

There are £350,000 in indebtedness. Permission given to sell their share after July 26, 1678.

Lieutenant Winthrop's Plantation in Old North Sound Division is included on the 1678 Census list with 4 white males, 1 white woman, 1 white child, 28 black men, 27 black women, and 12 black children.

The youngest son, Samuel, landed in Antigua in 1648 when he was twenty years old and remained there the rest of his life. He established a lavish home at Groton Hall, which was named after the English manor house where he was born, advanced to the post of deputy governor, and oversaw a large number of slaves. He closed the circle of trade between Antigua, Massachusetts, and England. He took on the role of middleman in the trade with England as well as the transportation of freight between the islands and New England.

Samuel Winthrop, a Quaker, served as the deputy governor of Antigua from 1667 to 1669. "Groton Hall" was the name of his plantation in New North Sound.

For £66,000 sterling, Jonas Langford, Francis Sampson's executor, sells a portion of 200 acres in New North Sound to Samuel Winthrop, a planter from Antigua.

One of the first people in Antigua to engage in sugar production, which eventually led to enormous fortune, Samuel had amassed more than 1,000 acres of land. Samuel Winthrop was a devout man who converted to the Quaker faith and offered his home as a gathering place for other Society of Friends members. With Jonas Langford of the Langford estate, he got along great.

The Dutch Admiral Michiel De Ruyter attacked Carlisle Bay on Barbados with a force of thirteen ships during the Second Anglo-Dutch War (1665–1667), destroying many English ships. Winthrop claimed that De Ruyter then captured "a great many ships at Montserrat and Nevis" before setting sail for New York. One of the ships he captured was transporting a precious cargo of premium sugar that was being delivered by Winthrop.

As the battle came to a conclusion and Samuel Winthrop was able to get back in touch with his brother in New England, he recounted the attack on Antigua in great detail. According to his account, the attack on Antigua started in Five Island Harbor, which is located close to the town of St. John's on the island's northwest coast. The French ships' cannonade silenced the English cannons that guarded the harbor. After that, the French landed troops and moved into St. John's, destroying every building in their way, including the governor's stone home (probably Carden). Carden tried to stop the advance, but he was taken prisoner, and his army was defeated. Given the dire circumstances, Samuel decided to send his wife and children to Nevis, sending them there in a shallop from the landing area on his property. During the third day of the assault, Lt. Colonel Bastiaen Bayer and 200 Antiguan soldiers guarded his fortified residence in St. John's port from a French force of roughly 600 men. Winthrop described the conflict as being "quite clever for about half an hour, and our soldiers withstood them very bravely, but being overcome with men, were put to flight. Both sides suffered many fatalities, but the English suffered more. The French "took several prisoners, ransacked the house, torched whatever that was flammable," and they were getting ready to finish taking the island the following day.

The last fortified building on the island at this point was Winthrop's Groton Hall, and the last of the English soldiers withdrew. The French forces arrived the following day around midday and asked that the English surrender while providing favorable conditions. If not, they would "with fire and sword, and offer no quarter," demolish the colony. After two days, a truce was reached, which allowed those who pledged their loyalty to France to retain their estates while giving those who refused to do so six months to sell their belongings and depart. In six months, a charge of 200,000 pounds of sugar was due.

The French commander established Groton Hall as his base of operations for the following week after the surrender. He "had 24 of my slaves (the rest escaped) and most of the slaves in the island, destroyed most of my cattle, and his warriors plundered the area surrounding" at that time, according to Winthrop. He only set fire to the residences of people who had evacuated the island, sparing Winthrop's sugar mills.

After the invasion, Samuel became the colony's most important leader. Throughout the course of his remaining years, he rebuilt his wealth to the point that, at the time of his death, he owned 64 slaves and more than 1,100 acres of land. He was given the small adjacent island of Barbuda for a duration of 32 years along with three friends. The four raised horses and livestock on the island.

Samuel Winthrop supposedly left a will on December 12, 1672, and passed away sometime in the following year. As a result of his son Samuel's marriage to Governor Philip Warner's daughter, Groton Hall would pass to his daughter. Samuel Winthrop: Quaker from Puritan.

Sarah Winthrop, a widow, receives a grant of Maiden Island in 1668.

The 240 acres that Henry Winthrop (b. 1649) owned in St. Peters. "Cinnamon Valley" was a 300-acre property owned by Joseph Winthrop (1653–1679).

Samuel Winthrop's estate owed £350,000 in sterling in 1678; sons Henry, Capt. Joseph, and Lieut. Sam Winthrop were given permission to sell Groton Hall in New North Sound.

150 acres are sold to Maj. William Barnes New North Sound in 1679 for 5,125 pounds of sugar.

1679: John Nibbs purchases 20 acres for £15,125.

231-acre "Winthorpes" in St. Georges.

1700: Winthrop Act draft stating that no other estate owes St. Peter's Parish half the value of the property in taxes and that Hon. Winthrop, the father and guardian of his son Samuel, has a plantation with 240 acres of waste. said Sam is currently eight years old.

In a letter from 1667 to his brother John, Samuel Winthrop, a noted early planter, writes: "I sent by George Parris to Richard Wharton 21 hogs of sugar to cover my sonne's debts in New England, of whose arrival I have as yet heard nothing. In addition to my land and twelve working black people, that is all I have left."

When Henry Lyons wed Sarah, the granddaughter of the first Samuel Winthrop, he acquired Groton Hall. As officers in Henry Holt's regiment, Henry and John Lyons (Lyon's) immigrated from Ireland in the late 1960s.

Groton Hall was damaged in 1715 by a blizzard that covered 231 acres.

"William Lyons of Groton Hall d.1776. Henry Lyons of Groton Hall estate in Antigua d.1715."

Letters from an Antiguan Sugar Plantation, 1739–1758 
"Years of drought caused devastation and misery on the estates, making life there far from simple. Managers frequently attest to extreme need in letters to absentee estate owners. When the local harvests failed, corn and beans were frequently sought as sustenance to keep the slaves alive."

The following passages are taken from letters written by Walter Tullideph to Governor Thomas and provide a quick overview of the difficulties of living on a plantation.

"Government of Thomas Antigua, April 10, 1742. We can't grow sugar here next year due to the hot, dry weather, and what we plant now will be used as a nursery to send flower bread and corn in anticipation of hard times. We are currently producing 24 hhds at 5 Islands and anticipate another 8 to 10 more, with the goal of shipping at least 25 home."

"Govr. Thomas Antigua, January 14, 1743. I expect that the rum will cover the costs and transport all of the sugar to London, given the state of his estates, which include plans to make 60 hhds at Winthorpes and close to 200 at North S. As a result, the Guinea Corn was unable to supply supplies. Dear Tullideph

The Honorable Geo. Thomas, Governor of Pennsylvania Antigua, August 8, 1743 One of the Mares was killed when the Mill was abot about ten days before we ended at Winthorpes, and one of the Points lost 7 feet, but with a weight to lead to it, the Mill finished the Crop.

Government of Thomas Antigua, October 5, 1745. You will find your plantation accounts for the year 1744 enclosed. The balance is in your favor and is 108. 2. 6 1/2 ukl, which is more than I had anticipated or wanted. At Winthorpes, I cleared land and planted ten to twelve acres of good guinea corn, leaving a sufft. Defense measures include the North Wind and the planting of potatoes next to the yam piece. so, I anticipate incurring few expenses for supplies this coming year.

Antigua, September 23, 1746. "The Honourable Geo. Thomas Esqr.

We have received word from home that our May fleet will arrive safely, that your 20 hhds.fm. Winthorpe's will be insured, and that the death of the King of Spain will probably result in a peace agreement with Spain. …. The extremely bad news is that it hasn't rained yet, all of your Guinea corn has burned up, it's too late to plant any more, there's no chance of a crop, and there's a good chance that supplies will be very expensive. Corn is now priced at $8 and is hard to come by. Given that shipping costs are considerable both from there and from America, I think it would be less expensive for you to supply your estates from Philadelphia than in beans from London. Your black population is forced to drink the spring water at Vogan's because the majority of the island's ponds are dry. I hope they are spared the fluxes. I am. Wr. T.”

"George Thomas Esq., November 22, 1749, Antigua. Slaves are likely to be in abundance this year because many Vessells have traveled to the Coast of Guiney. For Winthorpes in the Crop, I plan to purchase two men and two boys, as well as four young girls, and I assume at least as many for No. Sd. Northern Sound

taken from the internet page for Isaac Royall.

In Medford, Massachusetts, at 15 George Street, is the historic Isaac Royall House. It is a National Historic Landmark that is run as a non-profit museum and is accessible to the general public from June 1 through the final weekend in October. The Royall House is famous for its superb preservation, the fact that it is home to the sole remaining slave quarters in Massachusetts, and its connections to General John Stark, Molly Stark, and General George Washington during the American Revolution. A tea box that is believed to have been part of the batch that was thrown into Boston Harbor on the evening of December 16, 1773, as well as a tiny picture of Isaac Royall, Jr. on copper, both by John Singleton Copley, are among the historical artifacts on show.

The location's history was first documented about 1637, when governor John Winthrop erected a home there. This home was eventually replaced around 1692 by a more substantial brick building with exceptionally thick walls, standing 212 storeys tall and one room deep. The house and 504 acres (2 km2) of land were bought by wealthy merchant Isaac Royall, Sr., of Antigua on December 26, 1732, in what was then Charlestown. Isaac Royall was a slave trader and rum distiller (annexed to Medford in 1754). Between 1733 and 1737, he undertook a thorough renovation of the home, adding a third storey, covering the east facade in clapboard, and embellishing the outside with architectural accents and continuous spandrel panel strips. In addition, Royall built outbuildings in 1732, including the only slave quarters that are still standing in New England today. After finishing the building, Royall transported 27 African slaves from Antigua. By doing this, he increased the number of slaves in the neighborhood.

Winthorpes had 231 acres and 153 slaves in 1829.

1843: Inigo Thomas held 447 acres at Galley Bay, 231 acres at Winthorpe's, and 211 acres at Freemans Upper.

Inigo Thomas owns Winthorpe's 231 acres, according to the Antigua Almanac from 1851.

1852: The owner was Inigo Thomas. Village and Winthorpe's Bay are next to one other.

Cane Returns for the 1941 Crop: Antigua Sugar Plant, Ltd. Winthorpe's & Date Hill. 738 tons of cane were provided at a rate of 10.25 tons per acre, with an estimated 953 tons, a 70-acre estate, and 3 acres occupied by peasants.

The relocation of Winthorpe to make place for the American airport is described in a poem by renowned historical poet Mary Geo. Quinn.

By Mrs. Geo. Quinn, "NINETEEN FORTY-TWO"

"Nineteen Fourteen, the year the Americans arrived and swiftly removed us from the land we had called home for years, and settled us at Blizard's despite our fears and tears, is a significant year for residents of Winthorpe.

"In exchange for battleships to fight the enemy, Britain, the mother country, leased land to the Americans in British holdings abroad so they could build army and naval bases during World War Two.

"Luckily or unfortunately, our wonderful home, lovely old Winthrope's, was part of Antigua's strategic location.

"We were given instructions that required us to move, and we strongly objected.

"But, the government informed us that we actually had to leave.

"To be fair to everyone, I must mention that they provided us the chance to decide or choose our new home.

"We made the decision to go to Blizard's but insisted on keeping our name, so our community then became New Winthorpes.

"As the Americans left, the local government took control of the area. To accommodate the rising demand for air travel, they built the renowned V.C. Bird International Airport there as a real symbol of growth.

"The Dutch ships that landed there in 1666 during the Anglo-Dutch conflict gave the bay its name, Dutchman's Bay. Men from the ships marched ashore to Governor Samuel Winthrop's house, where he was forced to hand over control of the island. Written on the 71st anniversary of the expulsion of residents from High Point, Dutchman's Bay, and Winthorpes. Williams, Freeston T'ror

"In honor of Capt. Hamilton Coolidge (1895–1918), a United States Army Air Service pilot killed in World War I, the United States Air Forces established Coolidge Airport circa 1942. Around 1949, after the Base was closed, it was converted into a civil airport. It was renamed in honor of Sir Vere Cornwall Bird (1910–1999), Antigua & Barbuda's first prime minister. The first airport terminal building, which replaced the modest wooden terminal of the 1950s, was constructed with assistance from Canadian finance. Just north of the current terminal, a new terminal was completed in 2015 with help from Chinese financing and contractors.

Born in 1950, R. Allen Stanford. The area surrounding the airport terminal has grown to include a cricket pitch and restaurant, many offices, a printer, and a bank building after serving 110 years in a Texas prison for fraud in a significant Ponzi scheme. Everything was done with exquisite taste and in a Caribbean vernacular style, complemented by lovely gardens, leaving a lasting impression on people arriving in and departing the nation.

Populated places
The parish contains the city of Piggotts. 

 Barnes Hill
 Carlisle
 Coolidge
 Fitches Creek
 Gunthorpes
 Hodges Bay
 Marble Hill
 New Winthorpes
 Osbourn
 Paradise View
 Paynters
 Sea View Farm

Features
V.C. Bird International Airport is in Saint George Parish.

The Stanford Cricket Ground is also located in the parish.

Demographics

Antigua and Barbuda 2011 Housing and Population Census

Individual

Household 
There are 2,932 households in Saint George Parish.

Borders
International Borders
 None

Domestic Borders
 Saint John - South and West
 Atlantic Ocean - North 
 Saint Peter - East

Places of Interest
 Sir Vivian Richards Stadium
 Coolidge Cricket Ground
 Dutchman Bay

References

 
Antigua (island)
Parishes of Antigua and Barbuda